The following is a list of episodes for the reality television series The Great Food Truck Race on Food Network.

In late 2021, the fourteenth season of The Great Food Truck Race premiered, featuring their first ever season of all previously winning teams returning for another competition. The fifteenth season premiered on June 5th, 2022.

Season 1: 2010
Seven truck teams compete in the race for a grand prize of $50,000. Each truck team consists of a driver and two crew members who must staff the truck and are responsible for cooking, shopping, orders and publicity. Each week they start with no food to make things fair for all the teams who must make do with the seed money Tyler Florence provides at the start of each episode, in each new city.

Truck Teams

Grill 'Em All – A Los Angeles food truck with a theme inspired by Metallica's album Kill 'Em All. The three heavy metal enthusiasts, Ryan Harkins, Matt Chernus, and Joel Brown cook gourmet hamburgers with names like "the hatchet" (with sausage gravy and maple syrup) and "the behemoth" (with cheese sandwiches for buns).

Nana Queens – Sisters Janel and Shanel Prator, along with their friend Rick Wilson, representing Compton, California and dishing up hot wings and banana pudding. They even have a banana costume to promote their signature dish.

Ragin' Cajun – Generations of old family recipes are used to serve authentic Cajun food in Hermosa Beach, California. The team is made up of Lafayette, Louisiana natives Stephen Domingue, Joey Quebedeaux, and Jazmin Banionis, with Stephen playing up his crazy, outlandish personality to bring in customers.

Austin Daily Press – A food trailer from Austin, Texas led by Cory Nunez, his business partner Amy Hildenbrand, and his girlfriend Melani Feinberg. They started their business with the idea of tapping into the less serviced market for late night delivery. They serve hot, pressed sandwiches.

Crepes Bonaparte – Coming from Fullerton, California, this team is headed by engaged couple, Christian Murcia and Danielle Law as well as their best friend, Matthew Meyer. This truck serves sweet and savory Parisian-style crepes.

Nom Nom Truck – The second Los Angeles food truck and specializes in Vietnamese bánh mi sandwiches and tacos. The trio consisted of UCLA business graduates Misa Chien, Jennifer Green, and David Kien. Their plan was to partner up with local businesses in every city.

Spencer on the Go – A San Francisco food truck led by chefs Laurent Katgely, John Desmond, and Jesse Vera. Their aim is to serve high-end, French cuisine, going so far as to set up a folding table so patrons can enjoy a sit-down dining experience.

Episodes
Let's Get Rolling (Week 1)

The established trucks began the first-ever race in Los Angeles and they were given $500 to buy their ingredients before being sent to San Diego to sell their food over the weekend. This was meant to level the playing field because some of the food trucks were already from Los Angeles and had a loyal customer base. Most of the teams faced a slow first day; propane issues doubly affected Nana Queens. Both Nana Queens and Ragin' Cajun paid fees to get into a festival, with Nana Queens paying for the full two days and Ragin Cajun only finding out about the festival, and getting in, on the second day.

Truck Stop: The "Truck Stop" is a challenge described by Tyler as a twist to keep things interesting that will make them "stop what [they're] doing and take a new direction". There were no unusual challenges or hurdles beyond moving to a new, unfamiliar location. Since they made the most profit at the end of the episode, the technical winner is: Nom Nom Truck

Chile Santa Fe (Week 2)

The truck teams had to consider changing their menus when they reached Santa Fe during a light snowfall. They were given $300 seed money. Spencer on the Go suffered from engine trouble that delayed them in buying their ingredients and making sales on the first day. Grill Em All opted to pair up with Austin Daily Press, thinking two trucks would be more eye-catching than one.

Truck Stop: At the beginning of the second day, Tyler called all the trucks for their first official truck stop challenge. The teams had to make and sell a new dish with chili peppers. A Santa Fe chef, Eric Distefano, went around undercover to taste all the chili pepper specials and pick the best one. The Nom Nom Truck opted not to do the challenge. The Winner received immunity from elimination. A Winner was Spencer on the Go.

Truckin' To Texas (Week 3)

The trucks faced a drastic temperature change, where last week there was snow, this week they faced the Texas sun. They received $400 in seed money. Despite having the most expensive menu, Spencer on the Go has been calling up local French restaurants in every city to get wholesale prices. Nom Nom Truck's strategy of partnering up with local businesses was also helping them out. The Austin Daily Press set up a little league baseball field and donated 15% of their profits (>$200) to the little league.

Truck Stop: A quarter cow was delivered to all the teams who had to butcher it and make a new dish with it. A Fort Worth chef, Tim Love, went undercover to sample each food-truck beef special, and select the best one. The Winner received a Texan Rodeo Buckle, which represented $1,000 that was added towards their final tally. A Winner was Grill 'Em All.

Big Trouble In The Big Easy (Week 4)

All the teams planned to streamline and adapt their menus to suit the local tastes. They received $400 seed money and an extra 24 hours to do late night sales in New Orleans, one of the biggest cities for night life and partying. Once again, Austin Daily Press and Grill Em All teamed up. Spencer on the Go waited so long for a restaurant owner, to get wholesale groceries, that they didn't get a chance to make sales on the first day. A torrential storm on the second day slowed down sales for many of the trucks, and generator troubles affected Austin Daily Press. Partway into Day 2's late-night sales, they were told by Tyler to close up because their Truck Stop challenge would be in the early morning.

Truck Stop: At the docks, each team was given 30 minutes to fillet a catfish and create a dish from it. A local chef, Jacques Leonardi, tasted and selected the best dish that would win $500 toward their final tally. For the first time, the losing chefs got a punishment; they had to work together to fillet 700 lbs of catfish before they were allowed to start selling again. Winner was Spencer on the Go.

Small Town Trouble (Week 5)

With a population of only 5,000, this was the smallest town in this season's race, and all three trucks had to sell in one downtown spot. They were given $400 seed money and an extra 24 hours to sell but unlike the night crowds of other large cities, the townspeople of Jonesborough didn't stay out after 8pm.

Truck Stop: At a rustic farm, the teams had two hours to create a "five-course" meal (bread, beans, potatoes, meat, and dessert) using frontier-era cooking utensils and supplies. Two experienced chuckwagoners tasted and judged who created the best overall meal. The winner received a spot at a nearby auto show and access to thousands of potential customers. Winner was Grill 'Em All.

New York Plate of Mind (Week 6)

The final two trucks arrived in Lower Manhattan, with Grill Em All essentially being supported by previously eliminated Spencer on the Go who gave the burger boys a chef's jacket and the name of a restaurant wholesaler. The two trucks got $500 seed money and were given special instructions: they had to sell $500 in each of the five New York City boroughs, unable to move to the next borough until they hit the 500 limit in each (first the Bronx, then Queens, Brooklyn, Staten Island and finally Manhattan where the sales needed were doubled to $1,000). The first team to finish their necessary sales in all five boroughs would race to the top of the Flatiron Building to win $50,000. The Nom Nom Truck did slow sales, lagging behind Grill Em All, until they won the truck stop, allowing them to skip Staten Island and catch up to the other team in Manhattan.

Truck Stop: Tyler called the teams late into day 2 and told them to stop selling, and get some sleep so they'd be ready for their final challenge in the morning at Fort Greene Park in Brooklyn (at that point, Grill Em All was ahead in Manhattan while Nom Nom Truck was just getting into Staten Island). They had an hour to prepare the opposing team's signature dish for judge Chef Nate Appleman. The winners got a $500 bonus, meaning they could skip one of the boroughs. Winner was Nom Nom Truck.

Results

 Team that won The Great Food Truck Race.
 Team that won the Truck Stop for that week.
 Team that received the most money for that week.
 Team eliminated for that week.

: Had Grill 'Em All not won the Truck Stop, they would be going home.

: Had Spencer on the Go not won the Truck Stop, they would be going home.

: The team that makes the most money each week receives plane tickets and hotel accommodations to return to that week's city, courtesy of sponsor Orbitz.

Season 2: 2011
This time around, eight truck teams competed. They all met in Malibu, California, but were immediately sent to Las Vegas, Nevada, to officially start the race. The Truck Stops are outlined as little competitions to offer an advantage and Speed Bumps are introduced as twists meant to provide a disadvantage and force the teams to think on their feet. The grand prize was raised to $100,000 for this season only.

Truck Teams

Roxy's Grilled Cheese – A Boston food truck run by brothers James and Mike DiSabatino, along with experienced Chef Marc Melanson. They aim to bring upscale versions of grilled cheese by using high-end cheeses, confit vegetables and local breads.

Seabirds – Representing Orange County, this all-woman, all-vegan truck is run by friends Stephanie Morgan, Raya Belna, and Nicole Daddona. They plan to bring Cali freshness to the country in the form of beer-battered avocado tacos and BBQ jackfruit sandwiches.

Hodge Podge – Hailing from Cleveland, this truck is led by Chef Chris Hodgson along with his sister Catie and his girlfriend Jacquelyn Romanin. Their food is a self-professed "hodge podge" with ingredients thrown together to make tasty dishes.

The Lime Truck – The second Orange County truck, it's operated by Jason Quinn, Daniel Brockman, and Jesse Shemtob. They take a less-organized approach to menu building with different dishes for every stop. As long as it's fresh and delicious, they aim to make it.

Sky's Gourmet Tacos – A food truck from Los Angeles that serves Mexican/soul fusion cuisine. The truck is operated by Chef Barbara Burrell, her son Victor, and their friend Kevin Minor.

Café Con Leche – Operated by lifelong friends Gabriel Martinez, Maria Felipe, and Frankie Tosta, this truck from Van Nuys, California is dedicated to serving authentic Cuban cuisine and coffee.

Devilicious – A San Diego truck that's run by engaged couple Dyann Huffman and Mark Manning, along with their friend Kristina Repp. They specialize in over the top, twisted comfort food served with a "devilish" attitude.

Korilla BBQ – Coming all the way from New York City, Eddie Song, Paul Lee, and Stephan Park were Columbia graduates who turned to their Korean roots when they couldn't find jobs in their chosen field. They dish out tacos and burritos with modern Korean tastes.

Episodes
What Happens In Vegas (Week 1)

The food trucks all convened at the Malibu Pier before being directed to go northeast to Las Vegas, Nevada. They got $500 seed money. The Lime Truck partnered up with a local Vegas food truck they knew, and invited the Seabirds truck into the partnership. Korilla also called a friend who owned a food truck in Vegas to partner up. Sky's Gourmet Tacos blew out a tire on the way to Vegas, costing them time and money ($185) to fix, as well as an exclusive appearance at a festival. Roxy's Grilled Cheese clashed with The Lime Truck when they ended up at the same lot.

Truck Stop: There was no truck stop in this episode. Instead, the "Speed Bump" was introduced. It's a challenge that required all the teams to handle a sudden, unpleasant twist in a creative way.

Speed Bump: In honor of Las Vegas, Tyler spun a wheel of different problems that would hinder their truck (including "two flat tires", and "one man down"). The wheel landed on "out of propane" which meant all the trucks had to stop using propane with six hours of the day left. They could sell cold food, raw food, or find another way to cook (like butane burners or electric griddles).

A Pinch Of Salt Lake City (Week 2)

As soon as everyone arrived in Salt Lake City, they were given $100 seed money and their first truck stop challenge. All the trucks had to simplify their menus because of the small budget, some opting not to buy meat. The first day, Cafe Con Leche ended up booking a catering gig through the city's Hispanic Chamber of Commerce. Roxy's partnered up with a local food truck serving out of a large parking lot but was soon sent away by the property manager. Lime Truck opted to go vegetarian and went behind Seabird's back to sign an exclusive deal at a pet event. The second day brought varying degrees of success for all the trucks, with their customers following them when they had to move due to the speed bump.

Truck Stop: The food trucks had to make their own sausages by hand at a special sausage facility, then drive back 12 miles to pick five ingredients from a basic pantry table, meaning the last truck to arrive would get slim pickings. Local Chef Ryan Lowder picked the best dish, which would earn extra $100 (doubling their seed money). Korilla opted not to do the challenge but keep the meat to supplement their meager seed money. The Seabirds opted not to go to the sausage factory because they were vegan, so they were the first to pick ingredients off the table. Winner was Hodge Podge.

Speed Bump: The trucks were required to relocate at least one mile away from their current location. Since Hodge Podge won the truck stop, they didn't have to move.

Rocky Mountain Highs And Lows (Week 3)

Robin Roberts of Good Morning America was there to greet the trucks and help present part of the prize for the truck stop cooking challenge which was done as soon as they arrived. With only the truck stop winners getting seed money, the other trucks had to buy their groceries on credit. A partnership came about when Hodge Podge offered their location connections in exchange for Lime Truck promoting them on their TV spot. Cafe Con Leche had the fewest customers and got overcharged by a Cuban restaurant they partnered with.

Truck Stop: The teams had to forage for wild mushrooms in the mountains outside Denver and create a dish featuring the local mushrooms, with a box of pantry staples provided by Tyler. Local Chef Frank Bonnano picked the winning truck, who would do an exclusive interview with the local ABC news affiliate to promote their truck and get $200 of seed money. The remaining trucks received no seed money. Winner was The Lime Truck.

Speed Bump: On day 2, the trucks received a call from Tyler and John Elway who told them the trucks could only be handled by one member of the team.

Big Bites, Little Apple (Week 4)

The college town of Manhattan, Kansas meant a more modest, low-priced menu for heartland Americans. Even so, the teams got a generous $400 seed money. On the first day, Hodge Podge, Lime Truck, and Korilla ended up in the city park, while Roxy's parked near a smaller college. Word traveled fast and all the trucks got huge crowds. Seabirds had a slow start leaving many customers waiting. The Lime Truck started with an upscale menu but after the speed bump, had to close down and buy ingredients to make cheaper dishes.

Truck Stop: The trucks were given a $5 debit card to buy what they could at a nearby market and make a dish. Kansas City food critic Charles Ferruzza would be judging. The winning truck would be the only team allowed to park in Aggieville, a popular restaurant area near the university campus. Winner was Seabirds.

Speed Bump: The trucks were required to sell everything on their menus for less than $1.00 (a challenge they got on Saturday instead of the usual Sunday).

Hog Wild In Memphis (Week 5)

Once everyone arrived at the Memphis Court Square, as in previous episodes, they had to do a truck stop challenge. They got $500 seed money. Independent of the official 'Speed Bump' and 'Truck Stop', Tyler sent a local food blogger, "The Chubby Vegetarian", around to sample their dishes. The best dish was granted immunity, which was The Lime Truck. Korilla, Hodge Podge, and the Lime Truck had many ups and downs, in terms of customers. Towards the end of the second day, the power gave out in Hodge Podge's truck. In the end, Tyler disqualified Korilla BBQ for putting $2700 of their own money in the till; had they not cheated, they would've moved on with the third highest sales and Hodge Podge would've gone home.

Truck Stop: The teams had three hours to butcher and prepare a 100-pound pig and prepare a barbecue sauce to go with it. They were judged by Jim Neely, well known in the Memphis BBQ circuit. The winning truck earned an additional $500, doubling their seed money and they could go sell right away, while the losing teams had to butcher the remainder of the pigs (including the winning truck's pig) to donate to a local food bank. Winner was Roxy's Grilled Cheese.

Speed Bump: Partway into their first day, the trucks were told they could not serve any more meat and had to remake their menus into vegetarian ones.

Midnight Truck To Georgia (Week 6)

The trucks pulled into the Centennial Olympic Park and received $500 seed money before being sent out to get started on their truck stop cooking challenge. Hodge Podge had a strong first day thanks to getting exclusive access at Atlantic Station mall while Lime Truck and Roxy's picked poor locations with little foot traffic. Lime Truck managed to get the mall location on the second day, making up for some lost sales the first day; the only truck that didn't get the mall rush was Roxy's Grilled Cheese.

Truck Stop: The trucks had one hour to find the nearest place to buy peaches and peanuts, then run back to create a dish using mystery ingredients from 1 of 3 baskets. The peach retrieval had mixed results with Roxy's buying fresh peaches, Lime Truck only able to find dried peaches, and Hodge Podge having to settle on a free peach cobbler before time ran out. A local chef, Kevin Rathbun, judged who best used the peanuts and peaches and the winning team received $1,000 (and a large golden peach). The winner was Roxy's Grilled Cheese.

Speed Bump: The lead chefs on each truck were removed (and sent to enjoy a day at the High Museum), while the two remaining teammates had to operate the truck. With approximately 45 minutes left of selling in day 2, the chefs were allowed to return.

Miami Heat (Week 7)

The final two arrived at Watson Island to learn their goal was to reach $15,000 profit before rushing to South Pointe Park; first team there wins the grand prize. To start, they got $500 seed money. Hodge Podge was able to get product from an old boss of his while Lime Truck didn't get a chance to call their usual contacts, expecting a truck stop to delay them, so they just shopped at a big box store. Hodge Podge ended up at a car lot with other local food trucks. Midway into day 1, they got their first speed bump, disabling use of their trucks so Lime Truck cooked mussels on a portable burner and Hodge Podge sold high end sashimi with foie gras. Tyler put a stop to Day 1's late night sales because their truck stop was going to be in the morning. Then he shut them down again during the evening of Day 2 for the second speed bump.

Truck Stop: The teams had to venture out 5 miles into the Atlantic Ocean by boat and go fishing. They had 30 minutes to catch a fish and 30 minutes to prepare it. Local chef Michael Schwartz judged their dishes and the winning truck received $1,500 towards their till. Winner was The Lime Truck.

Speed Bump #1: The teams had 5 minutes to grab whatever they needed off their trucks before they were towed. To get their trucks back, they needed to make $200 from the food they grabbed. Hodge Podge was first to hit their target with Lime Truck catching up a little later.

Speed Bump #2: The teams were required to shut down for the latter part of Day 2. Then for the first two hours of day 3, the trucks only sold desserts.

Results

 Team that won The Great Food Truck Race.
 Team that won the Truck Stop for that week.
 Team that earned the most money for that week.
 Team eliminated for that week.

: Independent of the Speed Bump, a local food blogger, "The Chubby Vegetarian", visited each truck. The truck that received the best review was granted immunity. The winner was The Lime Truck.

: Although Korilla had the third-highest sales, they were disqualified for cheating when one of the team members added $2700 of their own money to the cash box.

Season 3: 2012
This season, eight truck teams competed but none of them owned a food truck. Instead, they were all amateurs who wanted their own food-truck business. Food Network designed each team's truck based on their proposed concept. The winning team would get $50,000 and got to keep their truck.

Truck Teams

Pizza Mike's – Veteran pizza makers with years of restaurant experience, Mike Evans, Pat Snyder, and Carlo Borgia come all the way from Columbus, Ohio, hoping to get back into the food business after Mike lost his restaurant in a fire. Their background is Italian food, and their specialty is pizza.

Momma's Grizzly Grub – After being inspired by previous seasons of the show, former financial analyst Angela Reynolds recruited her daughter Adriane Richey, and her best friend Tiffany Seth to join her in the third season of the race. They come all the way from Wasilla, Alaska to serve homestyle comfort food.

Pop-A-Waffle – Friends Bobaloo Koenig and Scott Stanley, with no kitchen experience, brought in chef Anthony Travers to help realize their dream of making their own gourmet waffles. They're from Los Angeles and they're excited to work for themselves.

Barbie Babes – This is the second all-female team made up of Hayley Chapman, Jasmin De Main, and Skye Boucaut. The three friends moved from Australia to Los Angeles and started a catering company to make ends meet. They developed a love for cooking, and they want to bring Australian barbecue all across the states.

Under the Crust – The theme of this team is sweet and savory pies. Chef Hannah Cohen, her mother Sheri, and her friend Gary Miller, have experience selling pies at farmer's markets in San Diego. Hannah wanted to start a food truck with her fiancé Keith but lost him to cancer.

Coast of Atlanta – Hailing from Atlanta, this is an all-chef team made up of Lena Price, her boyfriend Mike Jones, and their friend Tawanaca Davenport. They want to leave the restaurant world to work for themselves with their southern-style seafood dishes like shrimp & grits and fried catfish.

Seoul Sausage – This is the third Los Angeles team, made up of brothers Ted and Yong Kim with their friend Chris Oh. They have experience and a following from selling their sausages at events but want their own truck to regularly serve their Korean-style sausages and kimchi-fried rice balls.

Nonna's Kitchenette – Jaclyn Kolsby, Lisa Nativo, and Jessica Stambach are best friends from Parsippany, New Jersey and the third all-female team of the race. Their plan is to make traditional Italian food using recipes passed down from their grandmothers, including meatball subs and pizzelle ice cream sandwiches.

Episodes
3,559 Miles to a Dream (Week 1)

The teams all met at Long Beach, California to get their first look at the food trucks they will be using for the race. However, the new trucks are bare, and they had to stock it with not just food but cookware, utensils, and sanitary equipment (as mandated by the health department). They received $1500 seed money to fully stock their truck, then they had to go to Los Angeles to sell. Pop-A-Waffle teamed up with Barbie Babes who took so long to shop that they used their first day just to prep. Under the Crust didn't find a good parking location in the first day so they had no sales. After Under the Crust's elimination, Tyler announced that Food Network would donate $5,000 to the American Cancer Society in honor of Hannah's deceased fiancé, Keith.

Truck Stop: There was no cooking challenge for the amateur food-truck owners in their first weekend. They had enough to do trying to figure out how to maneuver their trucks.

Speed Bump: With six hours left in the second day, the teams had to relocate to Hollywood Boulevard to compete against each other in a sell-off.

Attitude at High Altitude (Week 2)

On the way to northern Arizona, Momma's Grizzly Grub called up Nonna's Kitchenette and Seoul Sausage to propose a team-up. The teams were advised to look over their menu and selling strategies because every city is different. They were given $400 seed money. Momma Grizzly's partnership worked well as Lisa from Nonna Kitchenette knew someone who lived in Flagstaff and allowed them to set up three spots downtown, attracting a huge crowd. Pizza Mike's stumbled onto the trucks and set up nearby, as did Barbie Babes later on, who priced their food too low the first day and adjusted for the second day's sales but were hampered by a slow shop and a bad spot. When Mamma Grizzly's sold out and closed early, Barbie Babes took their parking spot.

Truck Stop: Their first cooking challenge came halfway into the first day of selling. It required them to make a dish out of cactus and put it on their menu to be judged by local chef, Beau MacMillan. The winner got immunity. Winner was Pop-A-Waffle.

Speed Bump: At the beginning of the second day, the trucks were required to serve only vegan food.

Even Food Trucks Are Bigger In Texas (Week 3)

The trucks arrived at a baseball stadium in Amarillo which set the theme for the weekend. After getting $500 in seed money, they were told to shop and return to the stadium lot to compete head-to-head for the baseball crowds. They also got a chance to promote their truck during the seventh inning stretch. In the midst of preparing for their chosen ballpark customers, they got a truck stop. Pizza Mike didn't buy enough product for the ballgame and sold out early. On the second day Momma's Grizzly, Pop-A-Waffle, Seoul Sausage, and Coast of Atlanta were in a large grocery store parking lot. Nonna's Kitchenette got steady business at a hardware store, and thanks to this week's speed bump Pizza Mike's got stuck at a park they only meant to serve until 5 pm. Seoul Sausage was the only truck who could leave and opted to go back to the baseball stadium after serving the lunch rush at the grocery store.

Truck Stop: The teams had to include a ballpark special, a food that could be found in any stadium. They were judged by stadium concessionaire, John Ciarrachi. The winning team earned $500 and a mysterious key which ended up being useful for the Speed Bump. Winner was Seoul Sausage.

Speed Bump: On day 2, everyone had boots put on their trucks and were immobilized for the whole day. (Except Seoul Sausage who won a key in the truck stop that unlocked the boot and allowed them to leave their spot when the crowds died down.)

Baby Got Razorback (Week 4)

Another stadium was the destination for the trucks this week. They got $300 seed money and were advised that the Arkansas college town meant lower pricing and a more streamlined menu was necessary. The trucks were told to close early on day 1 for an early morning truck stop challenge. They were again told to close early on day 2 for a speed bump challenge. Nonna's Kitchenette, Seoul Sausage, and Pop-A-Waffle managed to secure the only three spots at a farmer's market, so Coast of Atlanta and Momma's Grizzly parked nearby. Momma's Grizzly accidentally knocked over a streetlamp and had to pay a $250 penalty.

Truck Stop: In the morning of day 2, the teams had to create a breakfast dish that included a secret ingredient, Pop-Tarts, to be judged by teen chef, Jeremy Salamon. They all got strawberry and a second flavor, different for each truck. The winner received a token that was worth $750. Winner was Nonna's Kitchenette.

Speed Bump: On day 2, the teams had to close their doors after serving breakfast and reopen at 1:00 am that night for the college-bar crowd. They would continue making sales until sunrise.

Music City Madness (Week 5)

The trucks rolled into Pottsville, Tennessee and finally got a truck stop challenge upon arrival. They were given $300 seed money. Three trucks had moderate customer turnout; the fourth, Pop-A-Waffle, had tons of customers after winning their truck stop. On the second day, Nonna's Kitchenette accidentally backed into a car with their truck and was penalized $250. Momma Grizzly's joined Pop-A-Waffle later in the day but business continued to be slow for most of the trucks.

Truck Stop: The trucks had to create a picnic basket, featuring their takes on classic Southern dishes. The winner earned $1,000 toward their till and the exclusive rights to serve 1,500 people at an event hosted by Joey + Rory. Winner was Pop-A-Waffle.

Speed Bump: On the second day, two members of each truck had to sit out, leaving behind the head chef. Two culinary students replaced the two team members and the chefs had to train them on the menu.

Mistake By The Lake? (Week 6)

After arriving at Voinovich Park in Cleveland, the teams got $100 in seed money and an assignment: buy three local Ohio tomatoes for a truck stop. Later in the day, Seoul Sausage and Nonna's Kitchenette partnered up with local businesses to recoup their losses from being shut down for three hours. Near the end of day 2, Pop-A-Waffle got a tip on serving concertgoers but they got stuck in traffic and missed any sort of crowd by the time they arrived. At the end of this episode, Tyler proclaimed they would continue on to the finale and gave them their seed money, $500, and instructions to start selling as soon as they get into the next town.

Truck Stop: The teams had to make a simple dish featuring a previously purchased Ohio-grown beefsteak tomato, judged by Outback Steakhouse founder, Tim Gannon. The winner got $250 added to their till, and got to sell for three hours, while the other teams had to shut down their trucks during those hours. Winner was Pop-A-Waffle.

Speed Bump: On the second day, the teams had to take what they could out of their trucks before closing them down and selling on foot from a hot dog cart until 6:00 PM.

Where In The World is Lubec? (Week 7)

The final two set out to conquer three cities across two states in the finale that started at the end of the previous episode. They started in Boston with large crowds but late into the day, they got a truck stop. The winner of the truck stop was announced early on day 2 and got a headstart on moving to the second city: Portland, Maine. Seoul Sausage followed and parked beside Nonna's Kitchenette on day 2 and day 3, serving up tons of people and earning almost the same amount of money from people who wanted to try both trucks' food. At the end of day 3, they were directed to drive to the little town of Lubec, Maine with a population of 1,600 people. The race ended on day 4 at West Quoddy Head Lighthouse where the team with the highest sales were given $50,000 and the keys to their food truck.

Truck Stop: Three fresh lobsters were delivered to both trucks and the teams had to make a New England style dish featuring the lobster. The dishes would be judged by two local fishermen, Christian Rodolosi and Clark Sandler. The winner got $500 added to their till, and got to move on to the next city, while the losing team had to shuck six bushels (600 pounds) of clams. Winner was Nonna's Kitchenette.

Speed Bump: An unofficial "speed bump" was given to the teams when they were on their way to Lubec. They had to sell everything for $2 or less.

Results

 Team that won The Great Food Truck Race.
 Team that won the Truck Stop for that week.
 Team that earned the most money for that week.
 Team eliminated for that week.

: Even though Pop-A-Waffle came in last place, they won immunity in the Truck Stop Challenge, and Barbie Babes were the ones who were sent home.

: Dollar amounts were not announced, but Tyler said that the Momma's Grizzly Grub total exceeded Barbie Babes by $170.

: Momma's Grizzly Grub would have finished in third place, but $250 was removed from their till to pay the insurance deductible for a destroyed city streetlamp.

: In weeks 3, 4, and 5 the winners of the Truck Stops also ended up earning the most money that week.

: Nonna's Kitchenette had $250 removed from their till to pay the insurance deductible for hitting a car.

Season 4: 2013
Once again there were eight teams competing, none of whom owned a food truck. This season reinforced the "race" part of the title by awarding varying amounts of monetary bonuses counted towards their tally for winning the challenges. That means that in each episode, the team who finished a special "Truck Stop" challenge goal the fastest, and drove to a preset destination, would get "first place" (and there would be "second place" and sometimes even "third place" bonuses worth less). Food Network designed each team's truck based on their proposed concept. The winning team earned $50,000 and got to keep their truck.

Truck Teams
Boardwalk Breakfast Empire – This truck from Sea Bright, New Jersey serves breakfast comfort food. Joanne Garelli had experience working at her family's coastal cafe for years until Hurricane Sandy destroyed the restaurant. Unable to raise enough funds to rebuild, she recruited her friends Timothy Boulous and Ilene Winters to help her win her own food truck.

Bowled and Beautiful – A Los Angeles team that creates California style bowls. Heather Marshall, Jessica Butorovich, and Liza Barnes are three single mothers who met in culinary school and want to have their own business for their children. They serve up couscous, rice, and even nachos in bowls with various toppings.

The Frankfoota Truck – Led by enthusiastic friends Mirlinda Kukaj, Dana Raja, and Victoria Florenza, and representing Brooklyn, this truck is focused on one thing: hot dogs ‒ and the many, different toppings that can be put on their childhood favorite food.

Aloha Plate – Brothers Adam and Lanai Tabura are joined by their friend Shawn Felipe. They grew up in Lanai, Hawaii and Adam was sent to culinary school thanks to a man he saved from drowning. The three have left the islands to serve authentic Hawaiian dishes to the mainland.

Murphy's Spud Truck – Culinary student Nicole Pollock, her mother Suellen, and her brother James are from Los Angeles; making them the second LA team. After graduating culinary school, Nicole got seriously ill. She hopes her specialty stuffed potato truck is her ticket to achieving her culinary dreams after her brief medical setback.

Philly's Finest Sambonis – Straight out of Philadelphia, childhood friends Erik Thompson, Joseph Toner, and Chris Tuchi serve authentic Philly cheesesteaks and sandwiches known as sambonis. Erik used to work as an electrician before a car accident caused nerve damage and left him unable to go back to that trade.

The Slide Show – The third Los Angeles team of the season features trained chefs Darrell "DAS" Smith, Ahren Samuel, and Maurice "Mo" McQueen. Das appeared on Food Network Star and even opened his own restaurant but his business partner double crossed him. Now he's ready to get back in the game with gourmet sliders and fries.

Tikka Tikka Taco – Brothers Michael and Shaun Swaleh have brought their Uncle Sam, coming from St. Louis to travel across the country and bring modern Indian street food to the masses. Their signature dish is their tikka marinated chicken tacos.

Episodes
I Left My Food Cart in San Francisco (Week 1)

The Hollywood sign overlooks the park where eight teams set eyes on the food truck of their dreams. Unlike last season, they had kitchen equipment. After being given $250 seed money, they were instructed to go to Beverly Hills where they had to make and sell one signature dish for no less than $20. On the second day, the trucks were sent to San Francisco (in a certain order thanks to a Speed Bump). They couldn't make the same dish they sold in Beverly Hills and they sold side by side at SOMA StrEat Food Park. Murphy's Spud Truck initially couldn't get their propane working, which meant they couldn't cook their potatoes so they were forced to make inexpensive salads.

Truck Stop: There was no cooking challenge for the food-truck novices in the first week.

Speed Bump: Early evening of day 1 had the trucks stop selling in Beverly Hills. They had to move to San Francisco early morning of day 2, but they would leave in 15-minute increments based on how much money they earned in Beverly Hills. Bowled and Beautiful made the most and left first, while The Frankfoota Truck made the least and left last (1 hour and 45 minutes after the first truck).

A Strange Brew in Portland (Week 2)

Everyone arrived in northern Oregon and learned that they would have to partner up with local businesses with private lots because they weren't allowed to park on city streets. They received $350 seed money. Rainy weather on the first day affected most of the trucks by limiting foot traffic. After the speed bump was announced, all the trucks raised their prices to stretch the food they got. Frankfoota, Tikka Taco, and Philly's Finest ran out of food before the second day. Everyone was able to restock mid-way into the second day and they got a Truck Stop challenge that had them changing their menu (they could only sell dishes with geoduck in it) and their prices (their dishes had to be $10 or less). The Franfoota truck got a $60 ticket on their car.

Truck Stop: The teams got 6 pounds of local geoduck and had to sell $200 worth (bumped up from an initial $100 goal). Once the $200 threshold was met, the teams had to race to Council Crest Park to find a token. The first team to retrieve the token won $500 towards their till. If they couldn't hit the $100 mark by 7 pm, they had to shut down for the night. Winner was Bowled and Beautiful.

Speed Bump: After their first day shop, the trucks could not restock until Tyler called them and told them so, which didn't happen until around 2:30 pm of the second day. This affected some trucks who planned to shop light with the intention of buying more food if they ran out.

Pocatello Is All About Potatoes, You Dig? (Week 3)

Since Idaho is known for its potatoes, the teams were told to meet at a potato farm that would prove to be important for later. They got $300 seed money and were sent into Pocatello to start selling. On day 1, Tikka Taco partnered up with Philly's Finest to sell at a farmer's market. They were joined by Bowled and Beautiful and Slide Show. Before any food got served, they got a Speed Bump that forced them to change their menu. Frankfoota joined Aloha Plate at a location that ended up being outside the city limits, so both trucks got penalized $50 for every hour they sold outside of Pocatello. On the day 2, the Philly's Finest truck hit a hanging sign and they had to pay a $500 deductible.

Truck Stop: On the second day, the teams were sent to the farm they visited when they first arrived, and they had to dig up their own potatoes to sell on their truck. After selling $750 worth of potato dishes, they had to race to the City Creek Trailhead for the chance to win one of three tokens that will add to their till; one large token worth $500, one medium token worth $250, and one small token worth $50. Winner was Bowled and Beautiful, 1st Runner Up was Aloha Plate, 2nd Runner Up was Philly's Finest Sambonis.

Speed Bump: Early on in the first day, the teams were ordered to remove all items containing starch (including bread, potatoes, and pasta) from their trucks and donate them.

About Face in South Dakota (Week 4)

The teams gathered at the base of the Crazy Horse Memorial where they received $50 seed money. They were sent to Rapid City and had to shop wisely because they got a Speed Bump right away. All trucks stationed themselves close to a store to replenish their stock and cut down on travel time, with some teams running and others hitching a ride from customers. Philly's Finest got into an argument on day 2 that was kickstarted by half their bread order being frozen. Aloha Truck has been using their "coconut wireless" Hawaiian connections to secure parking spots and bring in Hawaiian transplants to support them.

Truck Stop: On day 2, the teams had to go to the Wild Idea Buffalo Company one by one in 15 minutes increments based on how much money they made on day 1 (most money earned went first). There, they spent 15 minutes butchering their own quarter rack of buffalo. Aloha Plate was the first team to go and Philly's Finest Sambonis was last. After selling $1,500 of worth of buffalo dishes (with a $10 limit on each dish), the teams raced to Vista Point for the chance to win one of the three tokens to add to their till: one large token worth $750, one medium token worth $500, and one small token worth $250. Winner was Aloha Plate, 1st Runner Up was Tikka Tikka Taco, and 2nd Runner Up was The Slide Show.

Speed Bump: While the teams shopped, their cars got towed. Since only two people were allowed to safely ride in the truck, they had to figure out how the third person would be traveling when they had to move to their selling location and back to the grocery store to restock. At the end of the first day, each team had $100 taken out of their till to get their car back.

Double Trouble in the Twin Cities (Week 5)

Once again, the teams will be selling their food in two different locations; Minnesota's twin cities. They got $400 seed money and were sent to Minneapolis first. Philly's Finest accidentally ordered bread from two branches of the same market and had to pay $120 for the extra bread ordered and wasted. They were sent to St Paul on the second day but heavy rain hampered sales for all the trucks except for Aloha Plate who continue to get the word out to Hawaiian customers in every city they visit. Philly's Finest also had troubles on day 2 in the form of truck engine trouble but eventually, someone with jumper cables helped them out.

Truck Stop #1: On day 1, the teams had to serve all of their food on a stick, and sell $1,500 worth of it by 8PM. After hitting their goal, they had to race to Stone Arch Bridge to grab one of the two tokens to add to their till: one large token worth $750 and one small token worth $250. However, no team completed the challenge.

Truck Stop #2: On day 2, the teams had to create a special dish on their menu out of Spam. After selling $500 worth of food with their Spam menus, the teams had to race to the Peace Officers Memorial at the Minnesota State Capitol. The first team to arrive would win immunity and the other teams that completed the challenge by 8:30 pm would win $500 toward their till. Immunity Winner was Aloha Plate, $500 Winners were Tikka Tikka Taco and Philly's Finest Sambonis.

Speed Bump: The teams were required to move from Minneapolis to Saint Paul.

A Food Truck Kind of Town, Chicago Is (Week 6)

The trucks pulled into Grant Park to cook in a Truck Stop challenge. After that, they got a Speed Bump that would stick with them for the rest of the race. They got $500 seed money and were told that the finale had technically already started. Philly's Finest went out of their way to secure authentic rolls and when they drove back to find a selling spot, they were stuck in traffic, putting them behind. On day 2, they got their second Truck Stop. Tikka Taco got a parking ticket and Philly's Finest drove around without finding a decent location the whole day. Only Tikka Taco completed the second truck stop in time. There was no elimination this week and for the first time, three trucks headed into the finale.

Truck Stop #1: The teams had to create their own deep dish Chicago-style pizza using a portable wood-fired oven to be judged by Chicago Mayor Rahm Emanuel. The winning team got a proclamation from the Mayor and earned $1,000 toward their till. Winner was Tikka Tikka Taco.

Truck Stop #2: A sixth item had to be added to every truck's menu: A Chicago-style hot beef Polish sausage sandwich for $7 each. They had until 3:00 pm to sell 300 sausage sandwiches, then race to Mike Ditka's restaurant. The first team to arrive got signed footballs from Mike Ditka and a five-hour head start to the next city: Annapolis, Maryland. The losing trucks spent the five hours washing dishes at the restaurant. Winner was Tikka Tikka Taco.

Speed Bump: At the beginning of day 1, the teams were required to have a minimum of five dishes on their menu for the rest of the race.

Capital Gains (Week 7)

Continuing from the last episode, there were three teams headed for Maryland, with Tikka Taco having five-hour headstart. Philly's Finest got their friends and family to drive out and support them while Aloha Plate continued to bring out the Hawaiians as well as curious onlookers, and Tikka Taco pulled in crowds at a prime location by the docks. After the first truck stop, Tyler made a mid-episode elimination. The final two headed to Arlington, Virginia were Tikka Tikka Taco ($9,129) and Aloha Plate ($8,562). Leaving the race mid-episode was Philly's Finest Sambonis ($5,685). On the "fifth day" of the two episode finale, the two trucks had to go to the U.S Capitol Building in Washington D.C. where the winner would be declared. Food Network donated $2,500 to the Fallen Patriot Fund in honor of a fallen veteran friend of Shaun from Tikka Tikka Taco.

Truck Stop: On their second day in Annapolis, the teams were told to go to Kent Island, where they were required to haul their own crab and create an original crab dish. They were judged by Navy Culinary Specialist Jamar Hargress. The winning team received $1,500 toward their till. Winner was Aloha Plate.

Speed Bump: On their second day in Arlington, the trucks had to add a special dish to their menu that honored the other team. Tikka Tikka Taco added a teriyaki burger to their menu, while Aloha Plate added chicken tikka tacos with yogurt sauce. Both had to be priced at $10, and if they sold 50 specials before the race ended, an extra $1,000 was added to their till.

Results

 Team that won The Great Food Truck Race.
 Team that won the Truck Stop for that week.
 Team that earned the most money for that week.
 Team eliminated for that week.

: Aloha Plate had $150 removed from their till for being outside of Pocatello city limits for three hours.

: The Frankfoota Truck had $50 removed from their till for being outside of Pocatello city limits for one hour.

: Philly's Finest Sambonis would have finished in 3rd place, but $500 was removed from their till to pay the insurance deductible for hitting a sign.

: Philly's Finest Sambonis had $120 removed from their till to pay for loaves of bread they ordered, but didn't pick up from the store.

: Week 6 did not feature the elimination of a team, but the third-place team was instead eliminated at the start of week 7's leg.

Season 5: 2014
Like the previous season, eight teams of novice chefs and home cooks competed for a chance to open their own food-truck business. This season was treated as a "food-truck boot camp" for the contestants with each week focusing on a different topic. 
There were several tokens of various values awarded for most of the challenges, making it so the fastest team to get to the tokens, got to choose the highest valued one (which was applied to their final tally). Food Network designed each team's truck based on their proposed concept. The winning team will earn $50,000 and keep the truck.

Truck Teams
Lone Star Chuck Wagon – Hailing from Houston, Lance Kramer and his wife Rachel Young have a home business where they've sold BBQ sauces and rubs for years. Now they want to expand their business, so they brought their friend Andrea Chesley to help make BBQ and Tex-Mex.

Military Moms – Carol Rosenberg, Michele Bajakian, and Wendy Newman are from Fort Drum, New York and they've bonded through having husbands deployed in the military as well as their love of comfort food, which is their truck's staple menu.

The Middle Feast – Emigrating from Israel to Los Angeles, Tommy Marudi had a promised restaurant job before it folded. Now he's brought his sister Hilla, and his friend Arkadi Kluger to dish out Middle Eastern classics like falafel and shawarma.

Chatty Chicken – A family truck run by Greg Carder Sr., his son Greg Jr. and daughter Megan Jones. They've been having troubles with their roadside food stand in Chattanooga, Tennessee, so they hope a new food truck will help realize their southern chicken dreams.

Beach Cruiser – This truck comes from Venice, California. It's the brainchild of Gretta Kruesi who had bought a truck before but couldn't get it approved by the city. Along with her friends Shane Steinman and Nicole Hoffman, they want to bring "fish tacos and fried avos" to the masses.

Let There Be Bacon – The selling point of this Cleveland truck is bacon. Chefs Dylan Doss, Matt Heyman, and Jon Ashton have worked together for 10 years but after a bout with cancer, Matt couldn't work full-time at his restaurant job so he and his friends want a food truck to set their own schedule and menu.

The Gourmet Graduates – Roberto Franco, Keese Chess, and Julius Searight are from Providence, Rhode Island and just as their name suggests, this trio is made up of culinary school graduates. They aim to serve dorm food with a gourmet twist.

Madres Mexican Meals – From Norwalk, California, Chef Javier Crespo Jr. wants to prove to his father that he made the right decision in pursuing culinary. Along with his mother Luisa, and his wife Senorina, this trio aims to make authentic Mexican dishes.

Episodes
Venice Beach Brawl (Week 1)

The food-truck hopefuls converged on the docks of Santa Barbara to get acquainted with their trucks and get their first assignment: make three dishes with $200 seed money and start selling in Santa Barbara. Each truck got a metal briefcase that they weren't allowed to open until the time was right (the end of this season). Chatty Chicken didn't buy enough oil for their deep fryer so they had to pan fry everything which took longer. Everyone had to move spots because of a speed bump, which thrilled Beach Cruiser ‒ who teamed up with Let There Be Bacon ‒ since everyone would be moving to Beach Cruiser's home turf. Chatty Chicken had to go back to their truck twice while doing a re-stock grocery run. Let There Be Bacon closed early because their water wasn't running.

Truck Stop: In a blind challenge where none of the teams were informed, two local food-truck operators, Sabin and Jim (from Cousins Maine Lobster), went to each truck and asked for their best dish. They picked their top three favorites; the first place team got an extra $500 in their till, the second place team got an extra $200, and the third place team got $100. Winner: Madres Mexican Meals, 1st Runner Up: Beach Cruiser, 2nd Runner Up: Gourmet Graduates

Speed Bump: Late into the first day, every truck had to move from Santa Barbara, California to Venice Beach, California.

Theme This Week: Branding the Truck

Hot Doggin' It in Tucson (Week 2)

The trucks pulled into a veritable wild west set known as Old Tucson and got $300 seed money but had to spend $100 on marketing. Tyler gave each team a flag with their truck logo on it as a brand awareness and marketing starting point. While some teams bought props to get attention (Beach Cruiser and Gourmet Graduates), others paid for advertising (Madres Mexican Meals and Middle Feast), and others offered discounts or raffles (Military Moms and Lone Star Chuck Wagon). On day 2, all the trucks had to go to a local food festival for a speed bump.

Truck Stop: Partway into the first day, the teams had to add a $5 Sonoran hot dog as a fourth menu item. The team that sold the most Sonoran hot dogs would be awarded $500 toward their till, the second-highest seller would get $250, and third place would get $100. Winner was Beach Cruiser, 1st Runner Up was Military Moms, and 2nd Runner Up was The Middle Feast.

Speed Bump #1: The teams had to move from their current locations to a local folk festival and sell head to head, adjacent to each other.

Speed Bump #2: The teams had to create a jingle within a 30-minute time frame, then perform in front of a large crowd at the aforementioned folk festival.

Theme This Week: Marketing

Dinner Dates, Austin Style (Week 3)

The teams rolled into Austin where they got $250 seed money and a lesson in partnerships. Everyone's keys were put into a pot and the first key picked out got a chance to choose their partner. Lone Star chose Military Moms, Let There Be Bacon chose Middle Feast, and Beach Cruiser ended up with Madres Mexican. They didn't share sales but they did have to stick together in buying and finding parking spots. Middle Feast and Let There Be Bacon had good sales by securing a location at a gelato festival on Day 1, while the rest of the trucks had slow foot traffic. On day 2, Beach Cruiser and Madres Mexican made a deal to join the festival, upsetting Middle Feast who was promised exclusivity by someone else at the festival.

Truck Stop: The teams had to switch trucks with their partners for part of the second day, and cook their opponent's menu but the money they made went into their own cash till. Lone Star swapped with Military Moms, Let There Be Bacon swapped with Middle Feast, and Beach Cruiser swapped with Madres Mexican. The team who sold the most of their opponent's food earned $500 toward their till, second got $250, and third got $100. Winner was Let There be Bacon, 1st Runner Up was Beach Cruiser, 2nd Runners Up was a tie between The Middle Feast and Madres Mexican Meals.

Speed Bump: Mid-way into the first day, the teams had to relocate to a match.com dating event until 7 pm and vie for the attention of the participants who each had one $25 token to award their preferred truck (the object being to get the most tokens for their truck).

Theme This Week: Partnerships

High Steaks in OKC (Week 4)

After arriving at botanical gardens of Oklahoma's capital, the teams were told to add a beef dish to their menu, and they were given $400 seed money. To reinforce this week's theme about how "time is money", there was a secret speed bump at the beginning that Tyler didn't tell the teams about until after the fact. All the trucks ended up at the same neighborhood in the center of town and had huge lines the first day. The second day had various degrees of success with initial slower foot traffic for Madres Mexican after they parked at a race track. Madres Mexican also had trouble with a meat grinder for their truck stop challenge, slowing them down.

Truck Stop: On day 2, the trucks were told they had to sell fried onion burgers and fries for $10 for the rest of the day. The first team to sell 50 burgers would get $500 and the second team would get $250. Winner was Beach Cruiser, Runner Up was The Middle Feast.

Speed Bump: As soon as the teams left to buy their groceries, Tyler timed them to see who shopped, prepped, and opened the quickest. The teams had to shut down and reopen in 15 minutes increments in the order that they started selling. First open was Madres Mexican Meals (who didn't have to shut down), then Lone Star Chuck Wagon, then Middle Feast, then Let There Be Bacon, and lastly, Beach Cruiser.

Theme This Week: Time Management

St. Louis Upsell (Week 5)

The gateway arch in St Louis greeted the incoming food trucks and so did a speed bump. Every truck partnered up with a local business and every truck had huge crowds of people waiting for them. Lone Star raised their prices figuring people who waited on line would be willing to pay a premium price. Tyler made surprise visits to each truck to check on their timing and the quality of their food. He chastised Lone Star on their high prices in relation to skimpy portions.

Truck Stop: On the second day they were challenged to make their best dish. They would put it on their menu and sell it, then at 5:30 pm, they would go to the botanical gardens to have Tyler judge what they came up with. The winner of best dish got whatever profit they made so far, doubled. Winner was Lone Star Chuck Wagon (additional $5,000).

Speed Bump: The teams were given no seed money to start with, so they had to make their money by selling toasted ravioli.

Theme This Week: Food Quality

Shrimpin' Ain't Easy (Week 6)

The docks of Bayou La Batre was the inspiration for the theme of cooking locally. Since they were near the Gulf of Mexico, the teams were told to add three seafood dishes to their menu, using local ingredients. They got $400 seed money and a Speed Bump that allowed them to potentially get a lot of shrimp. Both Lone Star and Let There Be Bacon used local shrimp but peeling and prepping the shrimp slowed them down. Middle Feast chose not to get shrimp and did three different fish dishes. Lone Star planned to buy some higher quality fish for a potential seafood cook challenge, and to sell for a high profit, but they forgot to buy it.

Truck Stop: The second day brought a two-part cooking challenge where the three trucks were told to make a brunch dish which was bought by a random secret shopper and judged by Tyler. The best two dishes (Let There Be Bacon and Lone Star Chuck Wagon) would qualify to compete in a 20-minute Gulf Seafood challenge judged by Tyler and chef Pete Blohme. The best seafood dish would get $1,000 toward their till. Winner was Let There Be Bacon.

Speed Bump: On the first day, before shopping, the teams went to a warehouse freezer and had to guess and collect 100 pounds of shrimp by feel alone. Whoever got closest to 100 pounds got the shrimp they collected for free. The other teams were given a chance to purchase shrimp at wholesale prices. Winner was Lone Star Chuck Wagon.

Theme This Week: Local Ingredients

Finale at Mile 0 ‒ Winning Keys in Key West (Week 7)

The final two made it to Tampa, the first of five stops across southwest Florida. They revisited everything they learned in their food-truck boot camp. Both had to pick five dishes that best represented their brand: one dish had to be sold for $5, three dishes were to be priced at $10, and one dish for $15. They were tasked to record a 30-second radio commercial in the second city, Bonita Springs, that would play in their final destination. They were partnered up and sent to Naples, Florida to sell pre-chosen food to get their seed money. Alligator Alley was a bit of a detour and the setting for their last Truck Stop challenge, while Key West was the fifth and final city where they would sell their menu over the course of two days. Middle Feast stuck close to Lone Star during their final two selling days. At the end of the race, the two teams gathered at Key West's White Street Pier and the winners were announced by opening a briefcase (every truck got a briefcase all the way back in Venice Beach and inside the briefcase was the corresponding truck's logo).

Truck Stop: The teams took airboats all the way to Captain Gerald's House in the middle of the Everglades. There, they received some local alligator and frog's legs that they had to cook to be judged by Tyler. The winning dish got their seed money doubled. Winner: The Middle Feast (from $184.50 to $369)

Speed Bump: There were no official "Speed Bumps" but there were several challenges over the course of the finale. The major challenge was when the two trucks had to partner up in Naples and sell pre-determined ingredients; they would split whatever profit they made together and that would be their seed money moving onto Alligator Alley (Lone Star made $200 and Middle Feast made $169).

Theme This Week: All of the Above: Marketing and Branding in the commercial, Partnerships in selling for their seed money, Local Ingredients in the Truck Stop, and Time Management and Food Quality in their final city.

Results

 Team that won The Great Food Truck Race.
 Team that won the Truck Stop for that week.
 Team that earned the most money for that week.
 Team eliminated for that week.

: Dollar amounts went unannounced for The Middle Feast and The Gourmet Graduates in Week 2; however, Tyler Florence announced the differential between the two teams was $184. Keese said after the top 2 were announced that they "didn't even break $2,000".

: Dollar amounts went unannounced for Madres Mexican Meals and Military Moms in Week 3; however Florence announced that the difference was only $6.

: The Military Moms briefly mentioned counting "over $1000" before the show moved to the final results scene. Florence announced that their weekly earnings would be donated to the Wounded Warrior Project.

: Dollar amounts for Madres Mexican Meals were not announced.

: Dollar amounts for Middle Feast and Beach Cruiser were not announced, but they were separated by $160.

Season 6: 2015 (Route 66)
In this season, the format reverts to starring professional food-truck operators. Seven truck teams rode along Route 66, making stops along the way. The winning team earned $50,000 for their business.

Truck Teams
Spice It Up – This trio is made up of working mothers Nichole Mellor, Chris Paciora, and Keri Fraizer. Joining the race from Phoenix, Arizona, these women have a passion for bold flavors and spice-filled curries. Chris waited to start her business after her kids left for college, eventually taking on Nichole and Keri to show everyone that you can chase your dreams (or take them on the road) no matter your age.

Postcards – A Zagat-rated soul-food truck from Los Angeles, this team is led by Greg King who wants to open his own restaurant just like his parents. Initially taking up a corporate job, he would later quit and invest all he had into his food truck, serving up his family's time-tested recipes. Supporting him are his daughter, Grae and his friend Monique "Mo" Sutton, whom he considers a big sister.

Pho Nomenal Dumplings – Friends Sunny Lin, Sophia Woo, and Becca Plumlee come from Raleigh, North Carolina. Sunny and Sophia left their corporate jobs, and poured their life savings and Kickstarter donations into operating a truck serving Asian fusion cuisine that includes Taiwanese pork dumplings and corn dog Bahn mi. With Becca's Southern hospitality rounding them out, they believe all of their hard work will pay off in the end.

Waffle Love – Coming from a big Mormon family of 14 siblings out in Provo, Utah, brothers Adam, Steven, and Jared Terry rely on their faith and their food to guide them to victory. Adam always dreamed of a career in food, but it was after he lost his banking job where he truly began pursuing it. Starting his business with a loan from his grandmother, Adam and his borhters initially found struggles being the only food truck in their area. In this race, they want to bring Belgian Liège waffle creations to the masses.

Diso's Italian Sandwich Society – A New York City truck that serves fresh Italian sandwiches. Adam DiSilvestro was inspired by stories of his grandfather - a street vendor in his day - to start up the business and brought in chefs Danamarie McKiernan and Benny Chodan to see it through. After their business took a big hit in the past year, they hope the race will be the perfect way to set them cak on trac

The Guava Tree Truck – Authentic Cuban cuisine is dished up by this Dallas truck. The team is led by Onel Perez, his wife Pam, and their daughter Mariah. Onel worked in advertising for 16 years before finally quitting to sell the food taught to him by his parents. Driving around a once decrepit truck that has been remodeled, this family hopes their business will level up after the race. 

GD Bro Truck – Globally Delicious Stuffed Burgers is the full name of this Orange County truck. True to the name, Mark Cruz, Kevin Nguyen, and Geoffrey Manila serve up gourmet, stuffed burgers and fries. Mark and Kevin were co-workers at Disneyland, who also happened to be dating the same girl, but quickly bonded like brothers over their love of cooking. Quitting their jobs and partnering with Mark to start their business, much to their parent's chagrin, these three have taken Southern California by storm.

Episodes
All-American Road Trip (Week 1)

Since the contestants are all professional food-truck owners, they immediately get their first task: sell $200 worth of their most popular item on the Santa Monica Pier. The first team to hit their goal was Spice It Up so an extra $100 was added to the $200 they made. The other trucks made various amounts of money (from $140 to $20) which ended being their seed money, along with an extra $66 given by Tyler in honor of the route they would be traveling: Route 66. They all got a map directing them to Lake Havasu City, Arizona. Pho Nomenal Dumplings' truck broke down before they could start selling in Arizona so they had to get towed around to their selling destinations that weekend. The Guava Truck had a bit of trouble with their generator on day 2 but managed to fix it.

Truck Stop: In honor of Lake Havasu's London Bridge, the trucks were given cod and potatoes, and told they had to serve their version of fish and chips. First team to sell 20 orders received an additional $500 for their till. Winner was Diso's Italian Sandwich Society.

Speed Bump: There was no official speed bump in the first episode.

Off-Road Eats in Arizona (Week 2)

Staying in Arizona, the trucks drive to Flagstaff (with Pho Nomenal Dumplings having rented a new truck to replace their old one). Everyone received $200 seed money and were told to sell as much as possible for a potential advantage later on. All the trucks had trouble selling in cold, rainy weather the first day but Waffle Love sold the most and got a one-hour head start on day 2 when they would all be moving a few miles south to Sedona. All the trucks ended up selling at a large supermarket parking lot. There was a sizable vegetarian community in Sedona which prompted Spice It Up and GD Bro to add a vegetarian dish to their menu.

Truck Stop: Late morning on the third day, the teams had to sell rattlesnake rabbit sausage dishes while riding around in pink jeeps. At 2:00 pm, they had to return to pay $100 for the sausage. All profits from selling the sausage dishes would be doubled for every team. After paying for the sausage, Spice It Up sold the most with $435, Diso's Italian sold $265, GD Bro sold $199, Postcards sold $135, Phonomenal Dumpling sold $20, and Waffle Love was the only truck to lose money (-$10).

Speed Bump: There was no official speed bump but on the first day there was an early "Quick Fire challenge" which consisted of the teams competing to get the most sales of their signature dish. The winner got an hour advantage the next day. Winner was Waffle Love.

Spicy Showdown In Santa Fe (Week 3)

As soon as everyone arrived at Santa Fe, they were given a Truck Stop cooking challenge. The trucks had a steady stream of customers in the first day and were mostly busy at the farmers market on the second day, except for Spice It Up whose menu was presumed too complex for the morning crowd. They did manage to get an afternoon rush but they sold out with four hours left in the day, and couldn't restock thanks to a speed bump. Postcards accidentally dinged the bumper of a parked car and got fined $500 for leaving the accident and for the actual damage.

Truck Stop: The teams had to create a dish using New Mexican chiles and they were given $50 for additional ingredients. They were judged by local Chef Martin Rios and the best dish would get $1,000 towards their till. Winner was Postcards.

Speed Bump #1: In the middle of day 1 sales, the teams had to buy all the food they thought they would need for the rest of the weekend. They were not allowed to shop again even if they sold out.

Speed Bump #2: At the beginning of day 2, the teams were given spots next to each other at the Santa Fe Railyard Farmers Market and had to stay until the farmers market closed.

High Steaks in Texas (Week 4)

Everyone drove to The Big Texan Steak Ranch restaurant in Amarillo were they were given an initial $50 in seed money and the chance to earn more by completing a 20-minute eating challenge where they had to eat 72 oz of steak, a salad, a baked potato, three fried shrimp, and a dinner roll. The first to finish was Pho Nomenal Dumplings, followed by GD Bro, and Waffle Love. They received an extra $250 each. Postcards did not finish 11 oz of their steak and therefore only earned $150 for the steak and $50 for the sides. All four trucks ended up at the same supermarket parking lot on day 1 and they were all busy, though Postcards was slow to open due to their prep time. On day 2, GD Bro and Pho Nomenal sold in one parking lot and Waffle Love and Postcards ended up at another lot. Every Sunday thus far, the Waffle Love team went to church before selling their food so Postcards took advantage and sold to the people waiting there.

Truck Stop: While not officially identified as a truck stop, their culinary challenge was to make and sell a steak dish. The team that sold the most steak dishes would win an extra $500. Winner was GD Bro. There was a second part to the steak selling contest where all the steak dishes were secretly tasted and judged by the Big Texas Steakhouse owner Bobby Lee. The best steak dish would also get an extra $500. Winner was Pho Nomenal Dumplings.

Speed Bump: On the second day, two of each truck's team members had to leave for 30 minutes to go shopping for new supplies, leaving one team member to run the food truck by themselves.

Roadside Attractions (Week 5)

The remaining teams convened at the Blue Whale of Catoosa and immediately got their unofficial Speed Bump and $500 to spend on it and their food. Midway into day 1, Tyler and a local classic car club member, Dick McGuire, went to the three attractions to admire the attractions and taste each dish. Tyler told them where to go the next day then returned their phones.

Truck Stop: On day 2, the trucks arrived at the Admiral Twin Drive-in to serve to members of a classic car club. They had 20 minutes to go to as many cars and pitch their roadside special dish. Each club member then drove by the truck (getting food drive-thru style) and used a $25 chip to buy their preferred dish. The team who got the most chips was Waffle Love, with $925 total. Both GD Bro and Pho Nominal got $450 each.

Speed Bump: Upon arrival, the teams got their cell phones taken away and were required to have roadside attractions to market their trucks instead of utilizing social media. They also had to make a $15 lunch dish to complement their attraction.

Showdown In Chi-Town (Week 6)

The final two faced off under the St. Louis arch in one final truck stop cooking challenge. After getting $150 seed money, they were told to make a 3-hour pitstop in Springfield, Illinois to make more money for their final destination: Chicago. Pho Nomenal earned $796 for Chicago supplies and Waffle Love earned $755. The final challenge was to sell 50 dishes customized to three different neighborhoods: Chinatown, Little Italy, and Greektown. After selling all 150 dishes, they had to be first across the finish line at Buckingham Fountain. Waffle Love kept tabs on Pho-Nomenal via social media. Despite winning the truck stop, initially allowing Pho Nomenal to sell only 20 dishes in Chinatown (120 dishes across three neighborhoods), they were penalized for selling outside of Greektown's small boundaries, meaning they had to re-sell 50 dishes in Greektown (total of 170 dishes sold by Pho Nomenal in Chicago).

Truck Stop: Upon arrival, the teams were given chicken, ground beef, and pork steak to create three winning dishes in 90 minutes. Pitmasters Alex and Frank from Adam's Smokehouse served as judges. The winner would be able to sell 30 fewer dishes in Chicago. Winner was Pho-Nomenal Dumplings.

Speed Bump: Not dubbed as an official speed bump but a challenge: since Springfield was the birthplace of Abraham Lincoln, they were only allowed to collect $5 bills as their form of payment, requiring all dishes to be priced at either $5, $10, or $15.

Results

 Team that won The Great Food Truck Race.
 Team that won the Truck Stop for that week.
 Team that earned the most money for that week.
 Team eliminated for that week.

: Dollar amounts went unannounced for The Guava Tree Truck in week 1

: Dollar amounts went unannounced for Diso's Italian Sandwich Society and Pho Nomenal Dumplings in Week 2; however, Tyler Florence announced the differential between the two teams was $15.

: Postcard would have been first place, but they incurred a $500 total fine for hitting a parked car to cover the deductible and for not taking ownership of the accident.

: Final amount for Postcards was not mentioned. However, Tyler did mention that this was the most revenue from all the food trucks garnered on any episode of this series with an amount of $48,000.

: Final amount for GD Bro was not mentioned.

: Pho-Nomenal Dumplings won despite having parked and sold their 50 Greektown plates two blocks away from the designated Greektown boundaries. They were required to go back and sell another 50 plates within the designated Greektown boundaries.

Season 7: 2016 (Family Face-Off)
This season's theme is "Family Face-off". There were six teams competing, all of whom are families (or at least have two family members within the team). The race also stayed mainly in the state of California. The "Speed Bump" and "Truck Stop" challenges were no longer identified as such, but there's still at least one inter-truck competition in each episode. The winners received $50,000.

Truck Teams
Carretto Siciliano – Noted for having Vinny Guadagnino from The Jersey Shore, this truck specializes in homemade Sicilian food prepared by Vinny's mother, Paola, and his uncle Angelo Giaimo. Paola wants to open up her own restaurant in Staten Island, and Vinny aims to use his reality show fame and business savvy to bring attention, and customers, to her cause.

Grilled Cheese All-Stars – Twin brothers Michael and Charlie Kalish, from San Francisco, want to open a truck devoted to cheesy foods. They already have serious experience having trained as cheesemakers in France and worked on dairy farms across Europe and the U.S. Now living apart, they and their college friend, San Diego resident Bryce Adams, join forces once again to make their dreams of a gourmet grilled cheese food truck come true.

Lei-Away Leidies – Having moved from Laie, Hawaii to Provo, Utah, sisters Carey Ofahengaue and Summer Prescott never forgot their Hawaiian roots, and while they leave their flower shop behind at the moment, they want to bring poke bowls and teriyaki burgers to the masses via food truck. Summer's daughter, Autumn, who has worked several different jobs in her lifetime, is there to help her mom and aunt achieve their dreams.

BigMista's Fatty Wagon – Barbecue master Neil Strawder and his wife Phyllis own restaurants in Long Beach, California, but believe a food truck is the way to expand their business. With big personalities and bigger skills in BBQ, they hope to eventually pass down their business to their 9-year-old daughter. They're joined by their "adopted BBQ son", Eric Lara, who had been working in their restaurants for two years, and together they serve up southern food, with an emphasis on BBQ.

Fortune Cooking – All the way from Milford, Michigan, this team is led by self-proclaimed Samurai Chef Tom Lin, his wife, Julie Hill-Lin, and Julie's friend, Denver native Tiffany Webster. Though Tom owns several restaurants specializing in Asian fusion, and has competed in other Food Network shows, he wants to get into the food-truck business. With his skills in the kitchen, coupled by his wife's knowledge of business, they have the marks to make Tom's hopes a reality.

Sweet Southern Soul – Tiffany Ermon is a police officer from Chicago who has a passion for cooking her family's recipes, and seeks to open her own restaurant one day, dishing out quinoa and chicken southern bowls among many other soul-food specialtes. She's joined by her sister Tikia Travis and her friend Kizzma Snoddy, making them the second all-female truck in the race.

Episodes
A Family Affair (Week 1)

The six teams arrive via large bus to Six Flags Magic Mountain where they had to find the key to their food truck under one of twelve plates of funnel cakes; if they chose a plate with no key underneath, they had to eat the funnel cake. They got $300 seed money before being sent into Los Angeles to sell. Sweet Southern Soul had some trouble with their truck's pilot light and they couldn't make any sales on the first day. Vinny from Carretto Siciliano got a parking ticket which ate into most of his day 1 profits. On the morning of day 2, they got a phone auction/challenge. Tom from Fortune Cooking accidentally sideswiped two parked Los Angeles food trucks, damaging a mirror and cooler cover.

Challenge: Tyler offered a spot for one food truck inside Six Flags and each team had to bid for the spot, in the hopes that they would be able to make back the money they spent for exclusive access inside the theme park. Carretto Siciliano bid $400 and got the spot. The gamble paid off because they ended up with first place at elimination.

Things Get Berry Interesting (Week 2)

Up north in Oxnard, the teams discover there's a strawberry festival and after getting $200 seed money, they are given their first cooking challenge of the season. Lei-Away Ladies used a familiar past season technique of "coconut wireless" (first mentioned by season 04's Aloha Plate); calling in all Hawaiian locals in every city to support them. They got lost for a bit following a local Hawaiian to a parking spot but ended up at the spot and all his friends and family came to buy their food. On day 2, four of the five trucks started off at a farmer's market (Lei-Away stuck with their previous parking spot and got the repeat Hawaiian customers). Grilled Cheese sold their food for lower prices which meant more sales but an overall lower profit. Big Mista's overfilled their propane tank so they had to wait for the excess to leak out before they could cook, then later on, after picking a slow location they decided to close early.

Challenge: The teams had to buy strawberries from the local Oxnard strawberry festival and make two dishes, one sweet and one savory (this was like a "Truck Stop" cooking challenge). Bonnie Atmore, a spokeswoman for the strawberry festival, visited each truck to taste their strawberry dishes and the one she deemed the best would win $300 towards their till. The winner was Sweet Southern Soul.

An Egg-cellent Adventure (Week 3)

Further north in wine country, the teams rolled up to an ostrich farm (Ostrichland USA) where they were challenged to participate in an egg hunt inside a large ostrich pen. Each team member had to find an ostrich egg that was dyed a specific color related to their team. Once they found their three eggs, they could go start selling in Solvang. They got their $300 seed money and all parked relatively close to one another. All the trucks had huge lines on both days since Solvang is a tourist destination with Danish-style architecture.

Challenge #1: While they were shopping, the teams got a phone call telling them they had to make a family recipe dish using their three collected ostrich eggs. A secret shopper, Chef Seth, was sent around the trucks to try the dishes. The winner would get immunity from elimination. The winner was Carretto Siciliano.

Challenge #2: Partway through the second day, they were thrown a curveball (akin to a "Speed Bump") in the form of little aebleskiver pans that were delivered to all the food trucks. All the teams' pots and pans were replaced with the special Danish pans for a few hours.

A Dessert in the Desert (Week 4)

On the outskirts of Palm springs, the teams met near the Cabazon Dinosaurs tourist attractions and got $500 seed money. Since they were in the desert, the teams had to retool their menus to feature lighter fare and cooling desserts. That's where Tyler came in with another phone auction challenge. On the first day, the Lei-Away ladies took a long time finding a good spot and ultimately ended up downtown along with the other two trucks. On the second day, after a potential location did not yield any customers, Grilled Cheese tried to park near Caretto's but since it was a private lot, they parked just far enough away while still being close to the customers attracted by Carettos. The finale was kickstarted at the end of elimination with the final two given instructions to begin selling as soon as they reach their final destination. They were given $400 seed money.

Challenge #1: Before they went shopping, the teams got a phone call. They had to sell desserts priced at $6 but they had to bid on chocolate, fresh fruit, and nuts with each team getting exclusive use of the ingredient they bid the most on. Grilled Cheese All-Stars won exclusive use of chocolate for $25, Lei-Away Leidies paid $45 for fresh fruit, and Carretto Siciliano were left with nuts for $25. The team who sold the most desserts got $200 towards their till. The winner was Grilled Cheese All-Stars.

Challenge #2: On day 2, inspired by the Cabazon Dinosaurs roadside attraction, the three teams were challenged to become human roadside attractions for their food trucks. The team who took the most photos/selfies with people got an additional $200 towards their till. The winner was Carretto Siciliano.

The Island (Week 5)

The final two teams were ready to start selling right off the heels of the last episode. Upon arriving at San Pedro harbor, they had one hour to shop, prep, and load their trucks onto a barge heading to their final destination: Catalina Island. Then they encountered their final selling challenge. Once on the island, they competed head-to-head, side by side, and had 12 hours to sell as much as possible (instead of the past finales that ranged from 2 days to more). Tyler personally took the truck's cash boxes to count them up and announce the winner in front of the Catalina Casino. After the winner was announced, it was revealed that both finalists got their own miniseries on Food Network; Caretta Siciliano got 'Vinny & Ma Eat America' and Grilled Cheese All-Stars got 'Big Cheese'.

Challenge: While their trucks were transported, the teams had to sell hot dogs out of carts in San Pedro for about two hours. The team who made the most money selling hot dogs were taken to Catalina Island by helicopter, earning them an hour head start, while the other team had to travel by boat. The winner was Grilled Cheese All-Stars.

Results

 Team that won The Great Food Truck Race.
 Team who came in first that week.
 Team that won money towards their till that week.
 Team that earned won a non-monetary challenge for that week.
 Team eliminated for that week.

: For the first time, not counting the $300 seed money, only three teams made a profit. Despite being in the red, two teams in the bottom three still moved on.

: The winner of this week's "challenge" actually spent money (via bid) for a prime spot and ended up making the most sales.

: Dollar amounts were not disclosed but there was a $125 difference between the bottom two.

: No dollar amount was disclosed for Sweet Southern Soul.

: This is the only episode with two challenges worth money towards a team's till.

: Although they lost, Vinny and his mother Paola got their own miniseries on Food Network called Vinny & Ma Eat America.

: Brothers Michael and Charlie also got their own brief Food Network special in addition to winning the money, called Big Cheese.

Season 8: 2017 (Battle for The South)
Billed as a "Battle for The South", the eighth season featured seven teams of food-truck novices traveling across the southern states. For the first time in the series, they're not starting off in California, rather they begin the race in Louisiana and end in Georgia. Once again, there's no "Speed Bumps" and "Truck Stops" but there are still challenges worth money and occasional curveballs. The winning team gets a $50,000 prize courtesy of Farmer's Insurance.

Truck Teams
Stick 'Em Up - A straightforward theme of food on a stick from Rogersville, Tennessee. Shona House has a successful catering business and bakery back home, which she started to overcome the loss of her husband. Her business seemingly boomed overnight, helping to pay her two sons, Justin and Landon's, college tuition, and now they join her to help realize her dream of expanding her business.

The Breakfast Club – All three in this team are young, self-proclaimed millennials from Philadelphia. Mikey Robins leads the team with best friends Taylor Randolph and Ashanti Dixon. Mikey started cooking at a very young age and already operates an event planning/catering business at 19 years old. Together with his friends, they dish up breakfast and brunch inspired dishes like loaded breakfast nachos and mocha doughnuts.

Braised in the South – Nick Hunter, Steven Klatt, and Brandon Lap are a group of classically trained chefs and best friends from Charleston, South Carolina. Introduced to each other several years ago while working at the same restaurant, they serve up food with a southern flair like BBQ Shrimp Tacos and Cajun Chicken "Tatchos" (tater tot nachos).

Mr. Po' Boys – Running a successful food stand while they sing loudly at their Dallas farmer's market, polar opposites Cedric McCoy and Ryan Thompson are culinary school graduates with business know-how. They are joined by another culinary graduate, Esther Torres, and their specialty is gourmet po' boy sandwiches.

The Southern Frenchie – All the way from Little Rock, Arkansas, award-winning Chef Donnie Ferneau owned a restaurant for ten years before losing it due to debt. Along with his wife Meaghan and sous chef Amanda Ivy, he hopes a food truck will be his second chance to show off his southern food with restaurant flair.

Wicked Good Seafood – Bill Henrique, Ryan Schuhmacher and Dan Torres are a group of friends from Falmouth, Massachusetts with restaurant backgrounds in a seaside town where business is big in the summer, but slow during the off-season. Obsessed with food, they have a passion and knowledge for New England style seafood.

Papi Chulo's Empanadas – A family business on wheels; Luis Lara Polanco, his daughter, Carleena Lara-Bregatta, and his niece, Sarah Hasbun, are a team from Cherry Hill, New Jersey. Luis worked his way up in U.S kitchens since he immigrated from the Dominican Republic to escape poverty, soon opening a restaurant with his wife in 1999. Hoping to help his native community back home, he and his girls cook what he they best: Dominican empanadas.

Episodes
The Big 'Not So Easy' (Week 1)

The newest batch of contestants converged on New Orleans to meet with Tyler and receive a beignet cooking challenge right off the bat. After a few hours of selling beignets, they were sent shopping to make their signature menu. Braised in the South spent a long time looking for a parking spot and Papi Chulo's Empanadas had a trouble making their empanadas due to the heat. Some trucks had a good flow of customers (Brunch Squad and Wicked Good Seafood) while others hardly got anyone the first day (Braised in the South and Southern Frenchie). The second day saw a little improvement in customers for everyone.

Challenge #1: Each food truck had to sell their version of a decadent beignet in New Orleans. Ingredients were provided and any profit made was added to their $300 seed money. The truck who made the most was Stick 'Em Up ($131) and the team that sold the least was Wicked Good Seafood ($35).

Challenge #2: On day 2, the trucks had to make a special of the day using ingredients from the town's popular "Hurricane" drink (passionfruit, orange, and lime). New Orleans Chef Susan Spicer went to each food truck to sample and the pick best dish, which would eran that team $100 towards their till. The winner was Mr. Po' Boys.

New Marching Orders (Week 2)

The trucks headed east and arrived at the Naval Air Station Pensacola where they immediately get a "kickoff" cooking challenge. During the challenge, Papi Chulo's ran out of their tortillas before they could serve all the troops. Afterwards, they got $200 seed money and left to go shop and sell. Papi Chulo's couldn't find empanada dough at the store, so they opted to sell tacos. Southern Frenchie won a monetary challenge, so they initially didn't worry about first day sales, wanting to focus on prep for the second day. But when they saw other trucks with plenty of customers, they quickly scrambled to make sandwiches to sell. Po' Boys found out, via social media, that Stick 'Em Up had a good spot at City Hall and parked nearby. On day 2, Southern Frenchie joined the other two trucks at City Hall.

Challenge #1: Working in pairs, the food trucks had to make cohesive dishes to serve 50 aviation service members and the troops would choose their favorite dish of the three teams. The two winning trucks each got $200 towards their till. The Breakfast Club paired with Stick 'Em Up, Braised in the South picked Southern Frenchie, and the remaining Mr. Po' Boys worked with Papi Chulo's Empanadas. The winning teams were Braised in the South and The Southern Frenchie.

Challenge #2: The mayor of Pensacola, Ashton Hayward, wanted the teams to incorporate red snapper into a dish. The truck that sold the most fish dishes would win immunity. The winner was Stick 'Em Up.

Sweet Home Alabama (Week 3)

Looping up north, the teams reached the Tuscaloosa courthouse and were met with a physical challenge, then told of an additional pecan dessert challenge. They got $200 dollars seed money. Braised in the South and Southern Frenchie decided to park near breweries and got huge crowds. Most of the trucks, save for Stick Em Up (who chose to park at the supermarket parking lot), experienced heavy sales. Early on the second day, Tyler assigned them a "happy hour" special where they had to sell their pecan desserts for $1. Stick 'Em Up ended up snagging the spot that Mr. Po' Boys had the day before, but they underestimated the crowds there and quickly sold out. Mr. Po' Boys also sold out. All the trucks had waves of customers during the lunch hour.

Challenge #1: Two people from each food truck had 15 minutes to crack pecans. The team who cracked the most pecans in 15 minutes got mentored by baker Jan Potter and the rest of the teams had to clean up the pecan shells. The winner was Braised in the South.

Challenge #2: Everyone had to add pecan desserts to their menu. The team who sold the most pecan dessert dishes got $300 towards their till. The winner was The Breakfast Club.

Hot Chicken in the City (Week 4)

Home of the Grand Ole Opry and hot chicken, Nashville was the destination for the remaining teams. They had to do a taste and cooking challenge before they were given $300 seed money. On the first day, Mr. Po' Boys drove around for hours looking for a good parking spot. They weren't the only ones with troubles; all the trucks had low sales and sparse foot traffic. The second day was better all-around in terms of sales and customers, and it had Tyler and a guest judge going around to taste the food and determine the winner of the second challenge.

Challenge #1: The truck teams had to make their version of fried, spicy hot chicken but could not use chicken. Chef Aqui Hines went to each truck to taste and chose the best dish. The winning team got $500 in their till. The winner was Mr. Po' Boys.

Challenge #2: On the second day, the teams were challenged to do self-promotion for their truck. Tyler and country singer Craig Wayne Boyd went around and judged which team was best representing and promoting their truck. The winning team got immunity from elimination. The winner was The Breakfast Club.

Fresh Off the Farm (Week 5)

Arriving at Thomas Orchards in Athens, the teams were greeted by Tyler and a peach challenge. They got $300 seed money and were told to partner up with local business because, by law, the Georgia college town had no street parking. Braised in the South partnered with a brewery, Mr Po Boys used a print shop's parking lot, and Breakfast Club paired up with a bar and grill. One of the chefs from Braised in the South, Nick, got a surprise visit from his wife who offered support. The trucks all had ups and downs in terms of customers. Tyler went to each truck to talk to the teams, offering encouragement and advice.

Challenge #1: The teams had 30 minutes to make a savory peach appetizer for Tyler and Chef Mimi Maumus to taste. Then winners could choose to shut down their competitors for one hour at any point during their time in Georgia. Braised in the South won (and they shut down the other two trucks in the middle of day 2).

Challenge #2: As they were shopping, Tyler texted the teams and told them to change their menus for the weekend. In a Speed Bump-like scenario, they were not allowed to make anything they've sold in the last four cities.

The Race Through Savannah (Week 6)

The final two were on their way to the oldest city in Georgia when they got a call from Tyler telling them to start shopping and selling. They received $300 seed money at the supermarket. Mr Po' Boys immediately got a prime parking spot in front of a bar and it took Braised in the South a little while to find a spot. The teams were sidetracked by a selling challenge then returned to a steady flow of customers. The second day had the trucks moving to different areas for a seafood cook challenge, parked side by side, and competing head-to-head. They met at the Savannah riverfront to find out the winners by opening a briefcase; the winning team would have a case filled with the money.

Challenge #1: In the middle of day 1, the final two got a call and were told to sell their food out of pedicabs for one hour. The team that sold the most got $500 in their till. The winner was Braised in the South.

Challenge #2: At the beginning of day 2, Tyler gave both teams a location to go to. Every few hours the location would change, and they had to cook a different type of shellfish. The team who sold the most shellfish dishes got an additional $500 in their till. The winner was Braised in the South.

 1st location – Johnson Square (shrimp)
 2nd location – Savannah Civic Center (scallops)
 3rd location – Forsyth Park (clams)

Results

 Team that won The Great Food Truck Race.
 Team who came in first that week.
 Team that won money towards their till that week.
 Team that won a non-monetary challenge for that week.
 Team eliminated for that week.

: Dollar amounts for the bottom three teams were unannounced. However, if Braised in the South did not win the first challenge with The Southern Frenchie, they would have been eliminated

: Dollar amounts for Mr. Po' Boys and Stick 'Em Up teams were unannounced.

: The Breakfast Club won immunity this week, so they moved on to the next city. Had they not won the challenge, they would have been eliminated.

: Dollar amounts between Mr. Po' Boys and The Breakfast Club were unannounced.

Season 9: 2018 (Wild West)
Seven teams wanting their own food truck compete and travel along the west coast in a "Wild West" themed season. They begin in Los Angeles, California and the final two return there to finish the race. There are various challenges throughout the competition as well as the occasional curveball. The winning team gets $50,000.

Truck Teams
Sassy Soul – Three friends from Washington D.C., Parris "Sassy" Jewel, Lauren Carson, and Paris Henry, make up this all-women team who dish out comforting soul food. Chef Sassy started out cooking shrimp over rice for her friends to make some money and soon found she had a passion for it.

Just Wing It – Kevin Pettice, Sharon Shvarzman, and Steven Crowley met as contestants on season 12 of Worst Cooks in America. They were impressed by Kevin's chicken wings and based their food gimmick on that. They hope to prove to viewers that they can really cook now.

Buns N' Thighs – Chef Ian Sherwin has brought his girlfriend, Victoria Nones, and her mother, Marla, to try and make his dream of a food truck come true, hoping that their experience running a business in Chicago will give them an edge over the other teams.

New England Grill – Chef Kevin Des Chenes from Rhode Island, Chef Eddie Gallagher from New York, and comedian Christine Hurley from Massachusetts form a trio with a common goal; to bring the flavors of New England, from lobster to scallops to Yankee pot roast, out to the west.

Mobile Moo Shu – The second all-women team is made up of three friends from Michigan who specialize in Asian fusion food. Michelle Gautier and Marley Vanderbrook started cooking together in college, and Chelsea Smith learned Asian flavors while teaching in China.

Heroes on a Half Shell – From Frederick, Maryland, Donna Sheron leads this truck along with her oldest son, Clinton "CJ", and youngest daughter Danni. They specialize in submarine sandwiches, scooping out a good amount of soft bread and leaving behind the "shell" to hold more of their fillings.

Chops' Shop – Chef Bryan "Chop" Soliz, a professional caterer, joins the race from Pearland, Texas and he's brought his mother Sandra, and his aunt Sonia Buckelew to help serve up tasty Tex-Mex dishes like elote creamed corn and pulled pork nachos.

Episodes
Wagons Ho! (Week 1)

Everyone gathered at Watt Ranch, outside Los Angeles and had to complete a little challenge before they got their seed money ($500) and food truck. They had to hand-squeeze enough oranges to fill a pitcher before going to Los Angeles to start selling. New England Grill got to their truck first and Buns N' Thighs were the last to fill up their pitchers. Most of the teams converged on Hollywood on the first day but New England Grill was a few miles away and they accidentally broke their generator leaving them without lights. On day 2, most of the trucks had trouble finding a steady stream of customers with Sassy Soul spending most of their three-hour challenge window driving around.

Challenge: At the start of day 2, the teams had to sell beef dishes for $12 a plate in three hours. The most beef dishes sold garnered $200 towards their till. However, they had to bid from a choice of six prime cuts of beef (since there were seven teams, the loser would get a mystery cut from Tyler). Heroes on the Half Shell bought ground chuck for $30, Chops' Shop bought beef ribs for $45, Sassy Soul bought New York strip for $100, Mobile Moo Shu bought flank steak for $80, and New England Grill bought filet mignon for $100. Neither Buns N' Thighs or Just Wing It bid on top round so they were given oxtail. The winner of the beef challenge was Mobile Moo Shu.

Shrimp and Glitz (Week 2)

Sin City welcomed the teams with a shrimp challenge. Michelle from Mobile Moo Shu had family in Las Vegas who came to buy food and support her truck. On day 2, they got $200 seed money and were able to buy things to sell (besides the free shrimp in the previous day). Because almost all the food trucks lost money in the first episode, Tyler and restaurant-business consultant, Elizabeth Blau, went to each truck to taste their signature dish and offered menu tips and financial advice. Heroes on the Half Shell paired up with Chops' Shop and many of the trucks went through lulls and high-selling periods.

Challenge: As soon as they arrived in town, the teams were given shrimp and pantry staples, and told to make a signature shrimp dish to sell head to head on Fremont Street. The team who sold the most in four hours got a prime, exclusive selling spot next to the Las Vegas strip the next day (no one else could park on the strip). The winners were Mobile Moo Shu.

An Oasis in the Desert (Week 3)

The teams converged at a Sonic drive-thru restaurant in Phoenix and met with Tyler and Sonic's Senior Director of Culinary Innovation, Mackenzie Gibson, where they got a tasting challenge that preceded a cooking challenge. Just Wing It sneakily followed Mobile Moo Shu's online location posts and decided to park near them since they were the strongest team thus far. Victoria and Marla, from Buns N' Thighs, had to leave the competition to take care of a home business and an ailing father, respectively. That left Chef Ian alone to handle the food truck for the two days in Phoenix, a first on this show. The teams got $300 seed money and their "challenge flavors" for free (strawberries, lemons, iced tea etc.) Ian of Buns N' Thighs recruited a passerby to help on the first day and went at it alone the second day. On day 2, Mobile Moo Shu and Just Wing It were parked illegally so they had to move.

Challenge: Part 1 of the Sonic challenge involved a blind taste test of three specially chosen Sonic drinks. Mobile Moo Shu guessed the most flavors correctly and won. Part 2 had the teams making a dish inspired by one of five Sonic drinks: mango limeade, ocean water, cherry limeade, raspberry lemon iced tea, and strawberry lemonade. As winners of the first part, Mobile Moo Shu got first pick of their flavor: mango limeade. Just Wing It were given strawberry lemonade, New England Grill were given ocean water flavor (coconut and lime), Chops' Shop were given cherry limeade. Buns N' Thighs got raspberry lemon iced tea. Later on, Tyler and Senior Director Mackenzie judged which truck utilized the drink flavors in their dish the best,  and awarded $200 to the winner. The winner was Chops' Shop.

Bordertown Boom (Week 4)

The teams arrived at the Arizona Territory Prison and got a brief history lesson on the food provisions that passed through there, including artichokes and bacon. They all participated in an artichoke peeling relay race where each team member had to peel five artichokes. After fifteen artichokes were peeled, the teams could get their seed money ($300) and a cooking challenge. Just Wing It finished peeling first and Chops' Shop finished last. The first day, all the trucks ended up getting huge crowds and selling out of food; it affected Chops' Shop the worst because they decided not to buy too much initially, recalling their slow sales in past cities. Christine from the New England Grill truck suffered a head injury and had to be taken to the hospital, missing out on half the second day of selling. All four trucks were sent to a main street festival partway into day 2, and once again sold out, forcing them all to make a second shopping trip.

Challenge #1: Since bacon and artichokes were featured in the beginning of the episode, the teams were tasked to combine the two ingredients into a tasty dish. Whoever sold the most bacon and artichoke dishes would win immunity. The winners were New England Grill.

Challenge #2: A quick phone call from Tyler on the second day instructed the teams to get rid of their most popular menu dish and replace it with something new.

First Dates (Week 5)

Everyone met up at Hadley Date Gardens for another quick challenge before they got their seed money ($400) and the go-ahead to sell in Coachella Valley. They had to remove the pits from a pound of dates, without splitting the fruit, using wooden skewers. Just Wing It were the first ones to finish and New England Grill were last. All three trucks ended up on the same block on day 1 and had steady sales. On day 2, the trucks managed to get into a pre-music festival resort pool party for the lunch rush but when they left they had a slower dinner service, except for Just Wing It who opted to close early.

Challenge: The three trucks had to make a dish using the dates they pitted. The dishes would be judged by the co-owners of the Hadley Date Gardens. The best dish got an additional $600 in their till. The winners were Just Wing It.

The Whole Enchilada (Week 6)

The final two teams return to where they first started; Los Angeles. At the downtown plaza, they met Mexican restaurateur Bricia Lopez and found out they had to use Mexican ingredients, then they got $400 seed money. The first day, Just Wing It immediately got a parking space while New England Grill had some initial problems finding foot traffic. The second day had a slow start but there were steady sales, including some word of mouth attention for Just Wing It. Tyler personally visited both trucks to talk to them and give them an emotional pep talk. Later on, Mobile Moo Shu came by to visit Just Wing It. The final elimination took place at a western movie set in Paramount Ranch.

Challenge #1: On Day 1, they had to use chayote squash in a special dish. The truck with the best chayote dish got $350 in their till. The winners were New England Grill.

Challenge #2: On Day 2, the teams got a second Mexican ingredient, habanero peppers. The trucks had to sell habanero dishes for $10 and whoever sold the most dishes got their habanero profits doubled. The winners were Just Wing It. ($582)

Results

 Team that won The Great Food Truck Race.
 Team who came in first that week.
 Team that won money towards their till that week.
 Team that won a non-monetary challenge for that week.
 Team eliminated for that week.

: For the second time in the series, several truck teams ended up with negative balances (only one team actually made a profit after taking out the $500 seed money and what they bid on the beef).

: Dollar amounts for Sassy Soul were annanounced

: Victoria and Marla, from Buns N' Thighs, had to leave the competition to take care of a home business and an ailing father, respectively. That left Ian alone to handle the food truck for the two days in Phoenix, a first on this show.

: Christine from the New England Grill truck suffered a head injury and had to be taken to the hospital, missing out on half the second day of selling. She came back in time to help her team sell the most dishes that week, and they got immunity as well. Not that it mattered, for they won that week.

: For the first time on this show, the race ends in the same city where it began: Los Angeles, California.

Season 10: 2019 (Summer Beach Battle)
Nine teams wanting their own food truck will compete and travel along the east coast for a "Summer Beach Battle" themed season. The teams begin in Myrtle Beach, South Carolina. There are various challenges throughout the competition. The winning team gets $50,000.

Truck Teams
Baby Got Mac — A team from Los Angeles, married couple Clinton and Samma Jones started a catering company after cooking for friends at Dungeons & Dragons games. Along with their friend Rosa Linares, these 90's children serve up varying styles of macaroni and cheese. Spending all of their money on renovating a shuttle bus into a food truck, the couple want to use the race to finish their project and restart their business on the road.

Brunch Babes - A family affair and all-female trio from Grand Rapids, Michigan dishes out unique and decadent brunch dishes. Composed of dance coach Lara Webster, her cousin and anesthetic nurse Lydia VanWormer, and aspiring medical student Mariah Sniegowski, Lara's sister and a newlywed to a Marine; these ladies have a competitive nature inherited from their family. They look to stand out from the rest of the pack by busting out dance ribbons, acrobatic flips, and even a pineapple suit.

Frank-N-Slides — Based in Boise, Idaho, Chef Steve Weston, with military vet Craig Smith and energetic hype-man Kyle Moore, serve gourmet hot dogs, sliders, and French fries with specialty sauces that are, as they say, ‘punch you in the face’ bold. Steve also wrote a gourmet cookbook for the outdoors and portable cooking anywhere is his specialty. To drum up business, the team even have a hot dog costume to attract customers.

Madea Made - Residing in Virginia Beach, Virginia, former deputies and twin sisters Hope and Faith Johnson, along with Hope's husband Andre Thourogood, with whom she runs a catering business with, showcase the home-cooking skills their family has taught through the years. This team is serving up dishes described as "Southern soul food with innovation." Their truck name honors Hope and Faith's own grandmother Madea and the legacy of generations that came before them.

Make It Maple — From Montpelier, Vermont, Sue Aldrich, her enthusiastic son Charles, and best friend Paulette Fiorentino-Robinson, are passionate about cooking with local maple right from their backyards. So as such, the team features both sweet and savory dishes with maple flavors. The ladies know their food are crowd-pleasers from experience, as they have been catering to large groups for years.

NOLA Creations — Hailing from Atlanta, accomplished chef and Le Cordon Bleu graduate Darrell Johnson, his wife Anna, and sous chef Terrell Gaskin, are serving up New Orleans dishes just like home. Born and bred in Louisiana, Darrell and Anna were successful restaurant owners only for Hurricane Katrina to destroy his business and a deadbeat contractor wiping them out financially. Even after all those years, Darrell and Anna, along with Terrell who they met in Atlanta, will never leave behind their love for authentic Creole and Cajun food.

The People's Fry — All the way from Nashville, food service director Dareka Nicholson, her pit-master husband Terrance and her "spice queen" sister Mahdi Ekadi, have teamed up to create a menu serving every kind of loaded French fry imaginable. Blending Dareka's classical training, Terrance's BBQ mastery, and Mahdi's West African flavors, their food can satisfy every taste.

Rolling Indulgence — This team from Dayton, Ohio features three co-workers from the same restaurant. Head chef Drew Ballard, his high school sweetheart-turned-fiancée Jess Sarra, who works as a cocktail waitress; and best friend/bartender Travis Day, have a family dynamic – they not only work together, but they also live together. They are ready to hit the road in a classic 1950s diner food truck, serving diner classics and indulgent cheat day dishes, and win it all to create their own path in the food industry.

Sol Food Collective — Another team from Los Angeles, private chef, health and wellness practitioner, animal activist and food blogger Jacquelyn Jones looks to spread her message of delicious vegan food after her own experience eating a plant-based diet changed her life. Health issues caused Jacquelyn to have mobility problems, but since going vegan, she is active and feeling better than ever. Joining her is friend Malyssa Lyles, who stood by her during her illness, and Stephanie Graney, who she met via social media, in her determination to spread the healing powers of her healthy and delicious menu from town to town.

Episodes
Rumble on the Boardwalk (Week One)

Tyler and the nine teams kick off the race at Myrtle Beach, South Carolina, beginning their first challenge at Plyler Park. After their first challenge, teams were given $400 shopping money, before returning to the park to sell head-to-head with each other, continuing the challenge the next day. However, on the way to the store, Sol Food Collective had accidentally sideswiped the front of Rolling Indulgence's truck with their own, popping up Rolling's bumper and lifting a side of Sol's overhang counter. The weather eventually turned rainy, though everyone was able to get shopping done quickly but Make It Maple, who had trouble finding key ingredients. Back at the beach, water began leaking into some of the trucks, causing some of their appliances to falter. And it got worse for Make It Maple after Sue spilled all their milk for their Maple Dumpling dough, their most popular item. After the rain, the teams did everything to bring customers to their trucks for the rest of the weekend, from Terrence's infectious hollering to the Brunch Babes flipping and ribbon dancing, and Kyle wearing a hot dog suit.

Challenge #1: The first challenge was to make a "Boardwalk Bite" in 40 minutes. Ten beachgoers served as guest judges, including Tyler. The winning team received $300 to add to their till. The winner was Sol Food Collective.

Challenge #2: The following day, teams were back in the same location and given three pounds of crab meat donated by The Giant Crab Restaurant. Each team had to create a brand-new dish incorporating the crab meat. The team that made the most money from their dishes wins immunity. Sol Food Collective, being a vegan team, decided not to do the challenge, even pulling out a god's card to know if they should not participate. The winner was The People's Fry.

Back Nine Barbecue (Week Two)

Staying in the home state of host Tyler Florence, the teams arrive in the golfer community of Hilton Head Island, driving on golf carts to the 18th hole of Harbour Town Golf Links. Taking $300 in seed money as they head to the store, they would later be parked at Shelter Cove Community Park to begin selling for the day. Tyler had the teams sell barbecue that was incorporated into their main dishes, and as a gift, they were given five pounds of Carolina pulled pork courtesy of One Hot Mama's restaurant. As teams began their prep, several problems began to arise: NOLA can't ignite their pilot lights, Baby Got Mac's water isn't boiling, leaving them with no macaroni; and Frank-N-Slides had opened early despite being behind on both prep and now tickets. Brunch Babes also experienced problems, receiving tickets with modifications they can't keep up with. Terrence turned up his volume and began yelling out orders, which could be heard throughout the park. He goes as far as to walk to Frank-n-Slides to promote their fries but gets called out by Kyle as they engage in a fresh vs. frozen debate. Upon Day 2, Tyler asked customers how long they've been waiting in line, and many described a long wait, so Tyler lectured on getting food out fast at elimination.

Challenge #1: For this challenge, a person from each team had to take a five-foot putt to determine the side dish they will be making for the rest of the day. Last week's final totals and the possibility of sinking the putt determines the order in which they could choose from the side dishes shown to them. Everyone missed except for Baby Got Mac who won and got first choice of their side dish, macaroni and cheese. For the rest of the teams, in order from second to eighth, NOLA Creations picked fried pickles, Brunch Babes chose collard greens, Madea Made picked coleslaw, The People's Fry chose mashed potatoes, Frank-N-Slides picked hush puppies, Rolling Indulgence chose baked beans, and Sol Food Collective were left with green beans.

Challenge #2: Teams were given two pounds of boiled peanuts, the state snack of South Carolina, and had to incorporate them into an existing menu item. The team that sold the most peanut-infused dishes received an extra $400 in their till. The winner was Baby Got Mac.

Fast and Furious (Week Three)

Teams drove onto Daytona International Speedway, meeting Tyler on the infield. While thinking about last week and how they can do better this week, Sol Food Collective announced that Stephanie would be leaving the race. She was the one driving the truck when they crashed into Rolling Indulgence on Week 1, affecting her emotionally. To shift some positive energy into the fold, Tyler asked, "What the drivers do on the infield when they win?" (Answer: Donuts). Tyler introduced Donnie Summerlin, owner of Donnie's Donuts, to the teams as the guest judge for the first challenge. Later, they arrived at Daytona Beach Boardwalk to sell. As they prep, the health inspector came by and fined NOLA Creations $600 after finding some of last week's pulled pork tucked in the back of their cooler. Meanwhile, Brunch Babes, winners of the first challenge, plan on calling their prize - an audible pit stop - as soon as the others open their doors and steal the first sales. However, once the pit stop was initiated, everyone finished it in 15 minutes. Though after a short wave of customers, crowds began to die. On Day 2, Sol Collective lost another member when Malyssa began feeling pain and believed she had a kidney stone. With Malyssa going to the hospital, Deja vu from last season came as Jacquelyn was left alone. Still with no customers, Travis heads to the beach, meeting the leader of Arizona State Men's Gymnastics team; giving them an order for 16 people. Meanwhile, Samma decided to help Jacquelyn with her prep, which later evolved to one member of each team helping advertise Sol Food Collective.

Challenge #1: Teams participated in a "Donut Dash", where they had to craft one type of doughnut that fits their brand while making as many as possible in one hour. Each doughnut made was worth one point. The team judged for having the best-looking doughnut received two points per doughnut, and the best tasting doughnut was worth three points per doughnut. The winning team was able to call an "Audible Pit Stop" whenever they wanted, in which all sales and cooking stopped for the other food trucks while the winner continued to cook and sell. During the pit stop, the other teams had to play a game of cornhole to earn their way back into the competition by scoring 50 points. Brunch Babes won both "best-looking doughnut" and "best tasting doughnut" and received five points per doughnut. They made 27 doughnuts for a total score of 135. Madea Made made the most doughnuts with 51.

Challenge #2: Local Atlantic white shrimp was sent to the teams, and they were given one hour to create and sell a shrimp dish. The team that sold the most shrimp dishes received an extra $10 per dish added to their till. Sol Food Collective and Rolling Indulgence decided to not do the challenge due to vegan beliefs and confidence in sales respectively. The winner was Madea Made, selling 19 shrimp specials and adding $190 to their till.

Tampa 911 (Week Four)

As teams arrive in Tampa, convening in Downtown, the Hillsborough County Sheriff Chad Chronister and his deputy squadron come out, to which Tyler asks if someone was speeding. Sheriff Chronister came up to Tyler for a faux confrontation, before being introduced as judges for Day 1's challenge. After shopping, the teams had to find their own locations. Lara also revealed she is currently pregnant with her third child, a series first. Baby Got Mac parked at a community college - moving to an Ybor City farmer's market later - and Rolling Indulgence get selling in a parking lot across Curtis Hixon Waterfront Park, but both have trouble finding foot traffic. Travis, however, found another big group of people in a bridal party. Frank-n-Slides locate at the Sparkman Wharf; however, they're unable to sell their sliders due to ceompetition with the other restaurants. Brunch Babes invite Made Made over to their location; but with people not wanting to give up their spots in line, they leave quickly to an intersection. Day 2 rolls in, and so does rain. Rolling Indulgence and Baby Got Mac team up and park on the waterfront, but with is being a mess, they separately begin looking for a new spot. Brunch Babes goes back to their original spot, only to find no one. Frank-n-Slides are at a bar, where they get a visit from Craig's family.

Challenge #1: The six teams had 30 minutes to create their twist on a Cuban sandwich, a Tampa invention, and sell their dish to Tyler, Chad, and the deputies; the deputy squadron will vote on the winner. The teams were also given some roasted pork to work with, courtesy of The Columbia Restaurant. The winner receives a sheriff star badge that allows them to steal $100 from one team's final total at elimination and "not get arrested". The winner was Madea Made, who chose to steal from Frank-n-Slides.

Challenge #2: Fresh grouper from the Gulf of Mexico was given to the teams from Big Ray's Fish Camp, and they all had to incorporate it into a dish. The team who makes the most profit off the dish wins $400 in their till. Frank-n-Slides won the challenge and the week.

Burger Brawl (Week Five)

Teams pulled into Florida's premier alligator park, Gatorama. Tyler wants the teams to start taking risks, so he has provided them with gator tail and sausage to work with while prepping their menus; and for the first challenge, also have them be zookeepers for the park. With Frank-n-Slides' challenge advantage, they start early on prepping and selling. After an hour had passed, the others call up local businesses, but coincidentally, all but Madea Made secured spots at the same brewery, as the latter partners with one of the top food trucks in Fort Myers. As several teams take Tyler's advice by cooking the gator tail and sausage, Rolling Indulgence thinks that taking risks will further their chances of going home. Rolling, NOLA Creations, and Brunch Babes get slammed with customers and fall behind on their orders. Frank-n-Slides have a moderate line at their location, and Madea Made's crowd with their partner starts to dwindle after a rush of patrons. Tyler comes aboard the trucks to see if they took risks while letting Madea Made know that they need a better location tomorrow. The next day, while shopping, Hope and Faith argue, with the former just wanting to get everything on her shopping list. All the teams later park on First Street in Downtown Fort Myers. With people beginning to flock to the trucks, NOLA Creations are unfortunately still behind on prep as orders are being taken. Several teams start driving to new locations after the lunch rush, with Madea and Rolling being one location, and NOLA and the Babes selling at another.

Challenge #1: One team member acts as a zookeeper and has to move an alligator from a wet enclosure to a dry one; where the team with the shortest time handling their gator gets a one-hour head-start ahead of the other teams to prep and sell. The winner was Frank-n-Slides.

 Challenge #2: Tyler had the teams create a "Risky Road Trip" burger to sell on their trucks. A mystery judge from Sarasota, Chef Joe DiMaggio Jr., will go under the alias "Nick" and try all five burgers. The burger Chef DiMaggio thinks is the riskiest and tastiest wins immunity. The winner was NOLA Creations.

Shake Showdown (Week Six)

The final four meet Tyler on Lauderdale Beach where he gives them their first challenge, after which, the two pairs of trucks as a result of the challenges (NOLA Babes and Frank Indulgence), began selling. NOLA attempts to fuse the Babes' marketing skills with their culinary training, while Rolling and Frank's similarities are what they think will help them. Frank Indulgence hit up a surf shop, while NOLA Babes both have a brewery and a mall to go to, but both are unfortunately dead at first. With Frank Indulgence, they split the market with Frank-n-Slides handling burgers and Rolling handling desserts and drinks. Both pairs move to new locations, Frank Indulgence at a crowded brewery, and NOLA Babes at the mall lot; where there are more people than there was at first. On Day 2, the teams sell separately, but like last time, NOLA, Rolling, and the Babes all park at the beach. Meanwhile, Frank-n-Slides get a spot at a mechanics' shop, but sales start slowly. The Babes and Frank's use their respective pineapple and hot dog suits to draw business, with respective successful and not-so-successful results. For the second challenge, the four teams convene at the beach and were greeted by a call from Tyler and Senior Director of Culinary Innovation for Sonic Drive-In, Mackenzie Gibson. They sent two waiters to give the teams one of the four milkshakes in their hands. The flavors of their milkshakes would be utilized in a dessert challenge.

Challenge #1: Tyler had the teams create a signature skewer in 30 minutes to define their brand. But first, he had them throw javelins at four targets (2 with Surf, 2 with Turf) to determine their protein. Brunch Babes and NOLA Creations had Surf, and Frank-n-Slides and Rolling Indulgence had Turf. The winner would be free to select one team to be their business partner for the day, which includes a shared dish and splitting the combined profits equally. The winner was NOLA Creations, who chose Brunch Babes as their partner, meaning Frank-n-Slides and Rolling Indulgence would team-up.

Challenge #2: The teams set up a food truck park at the beach, charging $5 for admission, and selling a dessert inspired by the flavor of their milkshakes (Brunch Babes - Strawberry Cheesecake, Frank-N-Slides - Banana, NOLA Creations - Caramel, Rolling Indulgence - Peanut Butter). Patrons vote on their favorite dessert, and the winner had to choose between two options at elimination: Receive $200 overall or get $25 for every vote they received. The winner was Brunch Babes, who chose the overall $200, putting them in first and saving themselves from elimination.

Miami Meltdown (Week Seven)

The final three meet Tyler and Chef Jorge Alverez of the Stuffed Cuban Restaurant on the beach, standing with a whole slow-roasted crispy pig. That roasted pig will be utilized in the first challenge. Once teams got their pork, Tyler sends them shopping and selling. Rolling Indulgence go to a newly opened beer garden, NOLA Creations lock down an exclusive spot at Panther Coffee, and a couple of blocks down is Brunch Babes at Concrete Beach Winery. With NOLA having grabbed a spot that they wanted, the Babes prepare a batch of doughnuts and take them to the coffee shop. The two teams confront each other as the Babes question if NOLA actually have exclusivity. Tyler pulls up at the trucks and asks what it would mean to win The Great Food Truck Race. NOLA hope to restart their business after Hurricane Katrina, Rolling Indulgence - Drew and Jess, especially - to start their lives together, and Brunch Babes for Lara to show her children that you keep chasing your dreams. NOLA begins to party thanks to a trumpeter playing "When The Saints Go Marching In" as first day ends. Day 2 rolls in, as Rolling gets a spot at a classic car club, NOLA goes back to Panther Coffee, and Brunch Babes prep their menu with nowhere to go. They later call up Rolling to partner up at the car club, hoping two trucks can drum up customers to both of them. Tyler calls the teams for the second challenge, which involves coffee. While Rolling and the Babes have sweet desserts and drinks to use the beans, NOLA attempted to go savory, but problems with the coffee grinder leaves them with the sweet route. And to get more business, Travis and Mariah borrow the club owner's golf cart to advertise the trucks. When that fails, the Babes get a spot at the winery, while Rolling is still left with no patrons. And in the last hour with no one at the coffee shop, Anna brings 30 French-Ghanaian students to her truck.

Challenge #1: To determine which team gets which part, the three teams had to build a tower with the full 56 amount of dominoes they had at their station. The team that completes their tower the fastest gets first pick of the cut of pig they want. From fastest to slowest, NOLA Creations was the fastest and chose the Saddle, Brunch Babes was second and picked the Ham, and Rolling Indulgence were the slowest and were left with the Shoulder.

Challenge #2: The teams would use their meat in a challenge to sell the most pork dishes for $300 in their till. The winner was Brunch Babes.

Challenge #3: The teams were given Cuban coffee beans, a burr-grinder, and a moka pot courtesy of Panther Coffee. The challenge ordered the teams to use coffee in one of their dishes, with the team selling the most coffee-infused plates winning another $300. The winner was Brunch Babes.

Key Lime Clash (Week Eight)

The finalists convene at the piers to meet Tyler and his friend, Kelly Friend and family, with four conch shells in front of them. Tyler gives the two teams a little history about the Florida Keys and how the early natives came up with 27 ways to eat conch, which was involved in the first challenge. The teams later hit the stores and seem to have trouble; NOLA Creations can't seem to find the right boiled peanut, while the Brunch Babes have trouble complying with the high protein prices. Luckily, the butcher gives them lower, restaurant prices. With a small city comes small streets, where food truck driving is tough, but the two pull through. NOLA lands a spot in front of a rum distillery, and the Babes get into a parking lot behind a jewelry store on Duval Street but have trouble getting in thanks to a tree with low branches. As both teams start selling, Anna starts taking orders early again, but NOLA soon catch up with demand. Brunch Babes has a crowd of the store owner's friends and are selling, but it later goes quiet for a short time. As Lara works on the menu, she gets a surprise visit from her and Mariah's mother. The lunch rush dies down, but the finalists do what they can to draw people in; from NOLA's beads to the Babes' flips, ribbons, and pineapple suit. On Day 2, NOLA Creations decide to add an omelet to the menu as an homage to their compatition. But again, Anna brings in early orders. Tyler later approaches the trucks with friend and Miami restaurateur Michael Schwartz and a box with four spiny lobster tails that they had to use in another challenge. NOLA feels as if they keep undermining the Brunch Babes, so now they begin to hustle it. With a dessert challenge now initiated and $1,100 in challenges on the line, the final two need to push themselves to the limit if they want to win $50,000.

Challenge #1: The two teams chose one of their members to blow one of the conch shells, and Kelly would judge them on three categories: Tone Quality, Creativity and Loudness. The winner would choose one challenge dish they and their opponent had sold in the past to sell as a special. Brunch Babes won and chose their Babes Burger from Fort Myers, while NOLA Creations were given the Blackened Chicken Sandwich w/ Boiled Peanut Vinaigrette from Hilton Head Island.

Challenge #2: The two teams had to sell their "Greatest Hits" special that was chosen for them during Day 1 of Key West, and the team that makes the most profit from their special gets $400 in the till. The winner was Brunch Babes.

Challenge #3: The finalists were given one hour to make them a dish with the spiny lobster tails that Tyler and Michael would taste. The dish doesn't have to go on the menu and will be given an extra $300 in their till. The winner was NOLA Creations.

Challenge #4: The teams were delivered the ingredients for a key lime pie, courtesy of the Key West Key Lime Pie Company, and had to make a dessert with them that isn't a pie. The teams also had to make sure their dessert is worth at least $3. The team who sold the most key lime not-a-pie desserts gets another $400 added to their till. The winner was NOLA Creations.

Results

 Team that won The Great Food Truck Race.
 Team who came in first that week.
 Team that won money towards their till that week.
 Team that won a non-monetary challenge for that week.
 Team eliminated for that week.

: Dollar amounts for these teams were unannounced.

: While driving to the market for groceries, the Rolling Indulgence truck was struck by the Sol Food Collective truck. The damage to the truck incurred an insurance deductible of $200, reducing Sol Food Collective's earnings and moving Baby Got Mac from eight to seventh.

: Dollar amounts for these teams were unannounced.

: Before the challenge, Sol Food Collective notified Tyler that Stephanie was leaving, due to the accident with Rolling Indulgence affecting her emotionally and made it difficult to participate in the competition. The following day, Malyssa was experiencing severe pain from a kidney stone and was taken to the hospital, leaving Jacquelyn to cook and sell by herself. The other teams pitched in from time to time to help her during the challenge. Malyssa returned at the end of the day.

: Dollar amounts for these teams were unannounced. NOLA Creations originally finished 5th based on sales. However, at the start of their time in Daytona Beach, they were assessed a minor health code violation by the city Dept. of Health (accidentally storing leftover pork from the previous week). The fine for the violation was $600. After the fine, their total put them in 6th place, $1 in front of Sol Food Collective, and moving Baby Got Mac to fifth.

: Dollar amounts for these teams were unannounced. 

: Final sales numbers were not announced for the bottom two teams, only that Madea Made was $240 behind Frank-N-Slides.

: Dollar amounts for Brunch Babes and Frank-N-Slides were unannounced.

: Dollar amounts that week were unannounced.

Season 11: 2019 (Holiday Hustle)

Season 12: 2020 (Gold Coast)
Seven trios of food truck novices are invited to the "Gold Coast" of the southwestern United States. The teams will first convene in Santa Monica to begin, before making their way to Los Angeles to finish. That is, if they can survive the rest of the route. Making their ways through California and Nevada, this will be the most luxurious season to date with high-end ingredients and luscious scenery. Teams will have to endure daunting challenges, hardships of everyday life, both kinds of breakdowns, and even the threat of having their truck taken away. As always, the last team remaining will win $50,000 to start the food truck business of their dreams.

Truck Teams

Bachelor Kitchen - Austin natives and brothers Stephan "Stephnos" and John Nicklow, along with friend Billy Jenney, look to bring their Tex-Mex cooking out west. The brothers come from a family of restaurateurs, with Stephan having been taught how to cook by his mother and grandmother. Now, these bachelors are coming to impress, both with their food and with the ladies.

Crystal's Comfort Food - From Philadelphia is Chef Crystal Ashby, her husband Steve, and her sister Aleeyah West. A mother to four children, Crystal wants to use the race as an opportunity to teach them anything is possible. As well as attempting to keep her “dominant mother” side in check, these three serve sauced-up wings and other comfort classics from their restaurant out of their truck.

Eat My Crust - This team hails from Phoenix, Arizona and dishes out toasts that are both tasty and healthy. Operated by Zach Harman and his father Tyson, these CrossFit boys have both a competitive drive, but a good sense of camaraderie. With them is Preslie Hirsch, a woman Zach met at their gym, and both hit it off due to their love of fitness.

Lunch Ladies - Three actual lunch ladies from Cape Cod, these girls and a guy know what it's like to keep up with demand. Working at Martha's Vineyard and serving 500 meals a day, Jenny DeVivo and her coworkers, brother-&-sister Eli Carroll and Nisa Webster, drive a school bus-painted truck and serve Mediterranean dishes that are cafeteria classics in their school. And this isn't your typical team of lunch ladies: Eli and Nisa's foodie family kept them in the kitchen all the time.

Mystikka Masala - Out of Dallas comes "The World's Most Fabulous Drag Queen Food Truck". The first truck to feature anyone in drag, this far-out trio cooks up Indian-Tex-Mex fusion cuisine. Run by Andrew Pettke and Sarah Hartshorne, they bring along “secret weapon” 	Navin Hariprasad, the namesake drag queen who'll bring showmanship to the front of the house.

Super Sope - An all-female trio from Turlock, California, these girls look to bring the heat. Cousins Carina Stringfellow and Priscilla Gutierrez look to bring their grandmother's recipes of authentic Mexican cuisine to the masses on the coast. With Carina's sister-in-law Lindsey to manage the window, these girls wish to bring this truck to their tiny community.

Team Fat Kid - Coming from Virginia Beach is this trio of meat lovers. Restaurant coworkers Alex Carr, Jason Fossee, and Jacob Dooley are all about steak and bacon, over-the-top indulgence, and believe that no dish can be too outrageous. As Dooley says himself, “If you want a burger with 17 different types of cheese with bacon inside of it, we’re going to give you that.”

Episodes

First-Class Food Fight (Week 1)

The teams take a tour on a double-decker bus around California, before meeting Tyler at Santa Monica Airport. With a hangar housing their food trucks, a private plane, and seven covered plates of proteins, the first challenge of the season begins. Once the challenge was over, everyone received $400 in seed money and made their way to the grocery store. After a little Black Friday-like shopping spree, they drove to their arranged spots on Ocean Avenue by Palisades Park. As they prep, with one team having a one-hour head-start, Tyler stops by to see how the rookies are doing. As he does, he notices the mess Bachelor Kitchen has made, lecturing them on sanitation and threatening to relieve them of their truck if they don't treat it with respect. Day 1 gets rolling, and so does everyone. The Lunch Ladies' message, Bachelor Kitchen's samples, and Navin bringing out his drag queen persona are utilized in order to find customers. Before tomorrow comes by, Tyler gifts everyone a bottle of champagne, but not for what they think. Day 2: The contestants must find their own spots in Los Angeles. As they work on their menu and the challenge dish, the teams start to find the struggles as food truck vendors, having a hard time finding customers. But that won't stop them from getting a rush or clientele before the first elimination

Challenge #1: The seven teams have 30 minutes to make an hors d'oeuvre fit for a private jet. At the start of the challenge, teams will grab one covered plate that features the main protein (Sirloin steak). The winning hors d'oeurve will get that team $200 in their till and a one-hour head-start ahead of the other teams on Day 1 of selling. The winner was Mystikka Masala.

Challenge #2: Everyone must create a dish with champagne as a main ingredient. The dish with the most money made off of it will grant that team immunity at elimination. The winner was Bachelor Kitchen.

Food Trucks Ahoy! (Week 2)

Teams roll into the Navy town of San Diego for the second leg of the race, convening at the Southwestern Yacht Club for their first challenge. The teams get prepping and selling as four separate team members wait for their penalty to be called upon. And while most teams were able to have successful partnerships and crowds with local businesses (including a visit from Spencer of Season 11's Lia's LUMPIA), Crystal's eats up more time to sell as they move from spot to spot. It gets worse when Crystal and three other people from different trucks are pulled off near the end of the day. The next day, the teams come aboard their trucks with a crate of octopus, which they will use for their next challenge. As they battle with time, customers, and turf, the judge for the octopus challenge arrives earlier than some teams expect, especially for those who plan to cook the mollusk for a long time. As the teams take on the lunch rush, Stephan suddenly gets a personal call, something that will affect the whole team.

Challenge #1: The teams must team up in pairs and have one hour to create a meal consisting of an entree, side, and signature beverage for 60 members of the club. Pairs are Lunch Ladies & Mystikka Masala - Team Fortuna, Super Sope & Crystal's Comfort Food - Team Nemesis, and Bachelor's Kitchen & Team Fat Kid - Team Eloquence. The pair that club guests vote as the winners will choose one member of the four losing teams to be off the truck for two hours. The winners were Team Fortuna, with Dooley, Carina, Crystal, and Stephan being pulled off their respective trucks.

Challenge #2: The teams have to create an octopus dish for their menus. The winner that makes the most money on the dish gets $200 in their till. Additionally, executive chef Claudette Zepeda-Wilkins of El Jardin restaurant will whip around and try their dishes. The one Claudette thinks is the best will also get $200 in their till. Super Sope had the most sales, while Team Fat Kid had the best tasting dish.

Hustle In The Heat (Week 3)

The teams meet at the base of Mount San Jacinto in the desert city of Palm Springs, where they start their first challenge within a unique location. As they make their way down the mountain to their trucks to hit the streets of Palm Springs, Bachelor Kitchen will have to deal with a two-man operation in the wake of Stephan's departure. So, they decide to lighten the load with a simple menu. But it doesn't seem simple when John caused an accidental flare-up due to the propane switches being left on; searing some of John's arm hair, too. Team Fat Kid find themselves in the same boat as they have to put up with modifications in their orders. The next day, after some restocking and forcibly paying out of their income, Tyler surprises them with a call for their next challenge involving cacti (technically agave). Bachelor's go back to their challenge strategy of selling the special, and the Lunch Ladies prep in an empty parking lot waiting for the promised customers their location guaranteed, and Mariah of Season 10's Brunch Babes Truck visits Team Fat Kid.

Challenge #1: The teams will have nine minutes to create an elegant, signature salad that they will make on a tramcar of the Palm Springs Aerial Tramway to the top of the mountain. Once they reach the top at Peaks Restaurant, Tyler and Peaks executive chef John Fitch will taste their salads. The team with the tastiest, elegant, and most on-brand salad wins $250 towards their till. The winner was Bachelor Kitchen.

Challenge #2: The teams met Tyler at Moorten Botanical Garden and Cactarium to receive a jar of blue agave nectar. They will incorporate the nectar into one of their dishes, and the most money that is made off that dish will grant the team another $250. The winner was Bachelor Kitchen.

Viva Las Food Trucks! (Week 4)

The final four roll into Sin City itself, Las Vegas, Nevada; meeting Tyler at The Venetian Resort. Introducing hotel head chef Olivier Dubreuil, who will be judging their first challenge. 20 minutes later, the teams get $400 seed money, shop, and are unleashed on the Vegas Strip. Using the knowledge and experience from the past three weeks, the teams quickly get into a rhythm with their prep time; setting up by some of the most notable features in the city (i.e. Super Sope at Bonanza Gift Shop and Bachelor Kitchen at the Las Vegas sign). Varying waves of clientele end Day 1; whereas Day 2 brings the final four a surprise. Tyler secures the four trucks parking spaces in front of the Venetian Resort and their ingredient challenge.

Challenge #1: The teams have 20 minutes to create a world-class in-suite meal and deliver it to the Venetian's premiere penthouse, The Presidential Suite. But first, the teams head to the casino floor for a round of protein roulette. Mystikka Masala got Wagyu beef, Lunch Ladies received Alaskan salmon, Bachelor Kitchen had Blue crab meat, and Super Sope ended up with chicken breast. The team with the best and most practical room service dish will receive $300 in their till. The winner was Lunch Ladies.

Challenge #2: The teams get 2 1/2 lbs. of dark chocolate dropped by at their truck and must create a new dish that features it. They have to price it at $5 per plate and the most money made off the dish will grant that team another $300 for their final totals. The winner was Lunch Ladies.

Mission: Santa Barbara (Week 5)

It's final three time as Mystikka Masala, Super Sope, and the Lunch Ladies drive into the coastal, Spanish-inspired city of Santa Barbara. Revealing to the audience their reasons for wanting to win the $50,000, they meet Tyler on the grounds of AvoGanic avocado farm for their first challenge. With their batch of free avocados from the farm, the teams, two of them waiting an hour due to the challenge, get shopping and selling in the city. Mystikka decides to adopt the strategy of Bachelor Kitchen by limiting the menu to be focused on the challenge dish alone. It's business as usual at all three trucks until Tyler calls with their third challenge of the day. As they continue to sell, Mystikka nearly runs out of food, the Ladies have slow foot traffic, and Super Sope get sentimental as their family arrive at their truck. The next day, another call from Tyler brings another ingredient challenge. Business gets booming, with Mystikka and Sope having battled for the same spot, and the Ladies being bought out with some time being left in the day, but until sunset, all three hope to secure a spot in the finale.

Challenge #1: The teams must go around the gardens picking out 50 ripe avocados off the trees. They'll have to pick, slice, and pit the avocados, with the first team to do so earning a one-hour head-start. The winner was Lunch Ladies.

Challenge #2: The final three will have to use their avocados to create an avocado toast dish. The team that makes the most money from their dish earns $300 in their till. Additionally, Tyler and a secret shopper, head chef of Handlebar Coffee Roasters Aaron Olson, try the trucks' avocado toast specials. The special that he likes the most will grant the team another $300. Mystikka Masala made the most money, while Super Sope had the best tasting dish.

Challenge #3: Tyler has the final three create watermelon dishes with melons from Lanes Farm. When a team makes $300 off their dishes, they'll give Tyler a call; and if they're first, Tyler will give them another $300. The winner was Lunch Ladies.

Hollywood Homecoming (Week 6)

The two finalists roll into one of the finest wineries in LA located in the Malibu Hills: Rosenthal Estates & Winery; meeting Tyler and the judge for their first challenge. Once out of the hills, the Ladies and Mystikka drive to the neighborhood of Venice for Day 1. Their initial spots could not be more different. Mystikka has constant food traffic and support for their concept. Meanwhile, Lunch Ladies have inconsistent traffic, forcing them to move to Venice Beach. On the Final Day of the Race, the finalists set up shop in the side of Los Angeles they were assigned as a part of the last challenge. With the day winding down, Tyler stops by the trucks for his traditional finale Heart-To-Hearts. Asking what their reasons are for their love of food and any advice to those in lulls and being behind on their orders. It's definitely one of the closest finales in The Great Food Truck Race. Various sizes of crowds, people shrugging off the food trucks, Navin's drag queen persona not being eye-catching enough, and a visit from actress Marlee Matlin and a group of children at the Lunch Ladies.

Challenge #1: The finalists must create a sweet and a savory dish with two wines provided: Cabernet Franc and Chardonnay. After 45 minutes of prepping and cooking, Tyler and judge Dria Butler, a wine maker at Rosenthal, will taste their food. Up for grabs was $400 ($200 each for the application the judges thought was best) Mystikka Masala won both dishes, netting them the whole $400.

Challenge #2: This challenge has the two teams swap their truck's signature dishes. Mystikka Masala must make Lunch Ladies' A+ Chicken Wrap, and in return, Lunch Ladies will make Mystikka Masala's Chicken Tikkadilla. The team that makes the most cash off their swapped signature dish will get a special advantage. The winner will determine their last location for the next day of selling. The choices are between the north and south sides of the city separated by Mulholland Drive. North LA features the San Fernando Valley, home to movie studios, unique neighborhoods, and Ventura Boulevard. The south side hosts well-known neighborhoods (Hollywood, Beverly Hills, etc.) and famous tourist attractions. The winner was Mystikka Masala who set up in South LA, meaning Lunch Ladies would be in North LA.

Challenge #3: The teams receive a present of tiramisu and a note from Tyler. On the note are the instructions for their next challenge. They'll have to create two desserts (one priced at $15 and one at $5) made with the ingredients in tiramisu. This challenge is worth $400 ($200 each for the priced dessert they made more money on). Mystikka Masala sold more $15 dishes, and Lunch Ladies sold more $5 dishes.

Results

 Team that won The Great Food Truck Race.
 Team who came in first that week.
 Team that won money towards their till that week.
 Team that won a non-monetary challenge for that week.
 Team eliminated for that week.

: Dollar amounts were not said, but if Bachelor Kitchen didn't win immunity from the champagne challenge, they would be eliminated.

: Super Sope and Team Fat Kid tied for fifth place.

: Stephan of Bachelor Kitchen notified at elimination that he had to leave the race to take care of personal matters.

: Dollar amounts were unannounced for these teams. The difference between Bachelor Kitchen and Crystal's Comfort Food was $12.

: Dollar amounts for Bachelor Kitchen were not announced.

: The difference between Mystikka Masala and Super Sope was $138.

: The difference between Mystikka Masala and Lunch Ladies was $259.

Season 13: 2021 (Alaska - Battle for The North)
Tyler Florence and the competition go north to The Last Frontier, Alaska, in a battle for the north. In the coldest season of the show yet, teams will have to endure harsh weather, chilly challenges, short daylight hours, and potential frostbite. All while dealing with the rigors of running a food truck. $50,000 will be on the line as always.

Truck Teams

Breakfast For Dinner - From Saint James, New York, Harry Poole, Kate Wurtzel, and April Northdurft take a bit of breakfast and dinner and combine them to revamp classic dishes. With Harry and April's professional experience mingling with Kate's home comfort, they're excited to use this experience to learn the food truck basics.

Meatball Mamas - An all-female team out of Danville, California, Jocelyn Denson, Flora Londre, and Aly Romero sling creative meatball plates to the people of Alaska. Aly and Jocelyn are old culinary school classmates, and Aly and Flora's friends introduced them to one another. These three mothers are passionate about cooking.

Metro Chili - Dave Consiglio, John Sullivan, and Anthony Cucurullo are friends of 15 years from Staten Island, whose teamwork is mainly based in chili competitions. Competitive and creative, these chili brothers aren't about to lose out on a life-changing journey.

Querencia Mia - Michael Neu, Marie Yniguez, and Queneesha "Q" Meyers are a family built on the kitchen. Feeling it's where she's her most "authentic self", Marie is best when near culinary equipment. Q contributes pastry expertise with her cake shop business, while Michael assists Marie like how he assists her in a sandwich shop. Living in Albuquerque, New Mexican cuisine is their specialty.

Some Like It Tot - Powered in the kitchen by mother-and-daughter Nela Edwards and Drew Cowen of Tecumseh, Oklahoma, they and Austin native Kali - Nela's daughter-in-law - put out loaded tater tots to make money fast and easy.

Tasty Balls - Based out of Houston, Nadia Ahmed, Misti Buard, and "Chef D" D'Ambria Jacobs have a unique concept for their truck. Serving a variety of ball-shaped foods, Chef D and Nadia blend D'Ambria's southern meaty roots with Nadia's vegan lifestyle, as Misti mans the front.

The Oink Mobile - Run by Heather Clauser and her kids Tyler and Emily, this mother-son-daughter triad from Georgetown, Texas cook pork and bacon dishes. Tyler learned everything about the kitchen from his mother, who comes from a restaurant family.

Episodes
Battle For The North (Week 1)

Meeting Tyler on Flattop Mountain, the teams take in the beauty and numbing temperatures of the Alaskan wilderness. After having the route of this season's race explained to them, Tyler starts the race with a literal ice-breaking challenge. With teams moving out one by one, the selling portion begins on the streets of Anchorage. If they can get off the mountain, that is. Because of that time it took to drive into the city, teams are torn between getting in fewer orders than those who left early and just calling it a night. On their first full day of the season, teams are looking to break even and make profit before elimination. But for the Oink Mobile, a fire proves costly for their chances

Challenge: Tyler has the teams cook a breakfast for him in exchange for $400 of seed money. But in order to get into their trucks at the base of the mountain, they first need to break a block of ice to retrieve their keys. The winner, who would receive an extra $300, were announced at elimination. Breakfast for Dinner was first to finish, and Meatball Mamas was last. However, Meatball Mamas won the challenge.

Fire and Ice (Week 2)

Convening with Tyler on the bank of the Matanuska River in the agricultural hub of Palmer, the teams are immediately given a survival challenge, in case they need to bear the harsh Alaskan climate. With the prize for the challenge proving to be an early game changer, teams will have to quickly provide sales to customers. But in a small town like Palmer, it's not a coincidence that they ended up together. Except for Metro Chili, locating in a recluse spot thanks to a local food truck. The next day, winds speeds pick up, making it difficult to keep things from moving and fires alight. That is unless appliances don't heat up at all.

Challenge #1: In an Alaskan survival lesson, teams must build a fire to create a unique s'more. Only using firewood, kindling, and flint, the teams work against the weather to make s'mores for everybody to vote on. Only rules are that marshmallows must be used and that teams can't vote for themselves. The team with the best s'more will be able to close their competitors for one hour whenever they want. The winner was Querencia Mia.

Challenge #2: To honor Palmer's world-record largest produce, teams must sell vegetable specials using four of the following vegetables: cabbage, cantaloupe, broccoli, rutabaga, kale, kohlrabi, turnip, and carrot. The team with the most plates sold will earn that team $400. The winner was Querencia Mia.

Alaskan Alliance (Week 3)

Arriving in the seafood mecca of Homer, BFD's truck suddenly stops, with Rick, the on-hand mechanic, left to call a tow truck while BFD travel by car. Kali ends up with a migraine, leaving Nela and Drew to take on the first challenge. In a strategic attempt, Querencia, Tasty Balls, and the Mamas form an alliance to take out BFD and SLIT. Health and truck problems continue as Nadia gets grease in her eyes, and Meatball Mamas begin having generator problems. And for Querencia Mia, three early sell-outs and an improvised menu in the final hours prove detrimental.

Challenge #1: In a deep-water fishing challenge, teams will have to catch one adult fish in three hours to quadruple their $100 seed money. Querencia Mia made their catch first, followed by Tasty Balls, Some Like It Tot, Meatball Mamas, and finally Breakfast For Dinner.

Challenge #2: Teams have to create a new menu dish with wild king salmon, for which a special chef judge - Matt Masera - will taste them. The team with the best dish earns immunity at elimination. The winner was Meatball Mamas.

Gold Rush (Week 4)

Arriving in the small town of Seward, whose borders are defined by glaciers, the remaining four trucks indirectly agree to stay away from each other after what happened to Querencia Mia. Convening on the Harding Icefield beside Exit Glacier, Tyler immediately rushes into the first challenge. Seward crowds were slowly rising and/or falling, and another battle with the wind interfered with ticket writing and stabilizing menu boards. The following day, BFD messed with the Mamas by buying out the cheaper ground beef, forcing the latter to dip into yesterday's profits for meat. It doesn't help that they didn't get enough for a full day in the middle of service.

Challenge #1: Teams will attempt gold panning on the Resurrection River. After a demo by a prospector named Rick, teams will have to find golf in order to get their $400 seed money. Once Rick verifies their find, teams are allowed to head to town. Teams left in the descending order: Tasty Balls, Meatball Mamas, Breakfast For Dinner, and Some Like It Tot.

Challenge #2: Tyler delivers a bundle of fresh, live dungeness crab to the trucks, with which they have to create a new dish to sell on the menu. The team who sells the most crab specials wins $500 towards their till. The winner was Tasty Balls.

Frostbite (Week 5)

In one of the tiniest and least populated locations visited on the race, the final three reflect on previous strategies, shrinking demographics, and who to target next. In a forest at the base of Mount Denali, Tyler welcomes the teams to their first challenge. Tyler was kind to mention that frostbite could happen in minutes, which Nadia and her ear soon found out on the way to town. Once in town, the teams go local in their business partnerships, to varying degrees of foot traffic. On Day 2, a furious Tyler pulls up at the final three to give them a lesson in defending their names after reading some negative reviews. To see if that can change, he distributes comment cards for the customers to fill out. And in a town of just under 1000 people, the final three were soon to compete for customers at one location.

Challenge #1: Tyler invites a worker named Michael from Alaskan Birch Syrup & Wild Harvest to talk about finding chaga on birch trees. From there, the teams will have to search the forest where the company has hidden buckets of chaga, along with their seed money. The chaga must be used in a menu dish. But there's also two catches. Firstly, one bucket has $500, one has $300, and one has $150. Secondly, they'll have to wear snowshoes. Once they find a bucket, they can either take it and leave or keep searching if the bucket has less money than desired. Some Like It Tot found the $500, Breakfast For Dinner got the $300, and Tasty Balls were left with the $150.

Challenge #2: To see if the public's outlook on the final three can change, Tyler distributes comment cards for the customers to fill out. Whichever team has the highest ratio of positive-to-negative reviews will receive $500 towards their till. The winner was Tasty Balls.

Challenge #3: Tyler drops off bottles of birch syrup at the trucks, and whoever makes the most money off their birch syrup dish wins an extra $300. The winner was Breakfast For Dinner.

Fairbanks Finale (Week 6)

Tasty Balls and Breakfast For Dinner arrive on the cusp of the Arctic Circle in Fairbanks. A wild tundra that is scenic, peaceful, and barren, the finalists look to bring their A-game over the weekend to win the grand prize. With Arctic daylight being limited, which in turn keeps crowds from coming out, while potential clientele who are out having already ate, their best will have to include hard selling and strategic locating.

Challenge #1: Tyler has the teams cook a hearty dish with moose meat for tour guide David Monson, whose lived in the Alaskan inland for decades. The dish David likes better wins $400 in their till. The winner was Tasty Balls.

Challenge #2: On Day 2, Tyler throws a Speed Bumb-like challenge, making the teams rotate their members' usual roles for an hour. Head Chefs (D'Ambria and Harry) move to taking orders, Sous Chefs (Nadia & Kate) become Head Chefs, and Front People (Misti & April) are turned to Sous Chefs.

Challenge #3: Tyler challenges the finalists to make their own version of Alaskan ice cream with shaved ice, berries, fish, and animal fat. Whoever made the most sales wins $300. The winner was Breakfast For Dinner.

Results

 Team that won The Great Food Truck Race.
 Team who came in first that week.
 Team that won money towards their till that week.
 Team that won a non-monetary challenge for that week.
 Team eliminated for that week.

: Dollar amounts were not displayed

Season 14: 2021 (All-Stars - Battle of The Bay)

Set in the San Francisco Bay Area, where the food truck boom initially began, where the show initiated its first season, and the home base of Tyler Florence, previous winners of The Great Food Truck Race return for an All-Star season to see who the best of the best is. From wharfs to wineries to the home of the Golden State Warriors, the former champions look to collect another $50,000 and the title of "Ultimate Food Truck Champion".

Truck Teams

Aloha Plate - Winners of Season 4. From the Hawaiian cities of Lanai City and Pearl City, brothers Lanai and Adam Tabura, along with friend Shawn Felipe, return to the mainland US from Hawaii with authentic Hawaiian cuisine. After their experience on the race, SPAM picked up their brand and the team has been doing great things within their community and beyond; including stationing at festivals like Eat The Street in Hawaii and Coachella, establishing a community kitchen, and hitting the road with various food tours. Adam has even made an appearance on fellow Food Network show Cutthroat Kitchen. Their key strategy is networking with local Hawaiians, Polynesians, and various ethnicities to drum up business.

The Lime Truck - Winners of Season 2. Originally from Irvine, California, Daniel Shemtob and Jesse Brockman return with new member Mark Esposito, representing the neighboring Orange County with rotating menus and a continued passion for freshness. Since their times on the race, The Lime Truck brand has expanded, earning numerous awards, catering for high-end events in Hollywood, creating a beer, and establishing two brick-and-mortar locations. With their years of culinary experience, they aren't intimidated by the rest of the competition

The Middle Feast - Winners of Season 5. Owner and head chef Tommy Marudi brings with him little sister Daniella and new sous chef Gabriel Villagrana to reintroduce the viewers to Middle Eastern classics that won him $50,000. Having added Asian and Mexican influences to the menu after the race to appeal to other demographics, Tommy has given Los Angeles a proper taste of the Mediterranean and has become a relative favorite to cater events. The inspiration he can achieve from one concept (ingredient, location, or experience), along with the know-how of selling on the streets will help his team gain $50,000 more.

Mystikka Masala - Winners of Season 12. Couple Andrew Pettke and Navin Hariprasad relocated from Dallas to Santa Monica to branch their restaurants, and have found a team member in Andrew's friend Doug Long. Returning with their Indian Tex-Mex concept and Navin's showmanship as the titular drag queen, Mystikka Masala return to the competition to prove why they won their season. The team has offered cooking classes and spice blends to the public since their victory. Using the Mystikka Masala character to market their brand helped win them the competition before, and they hope to do it again

NOLA Creations - Winners of Season 10. Husband-and-Wife Darrell & Aunna Johnson, with chef/friend Terrell Gaskin, bring back to take on New Orleans food culture to the race this season. Returning to Shreveport, Louisiana from Atlanta, the former restaurateurs-turned-food truck operators have been doing well since their last race, offering catering services, recipes, and a food services program to their community after reentering the food business. Their authenticity to New Orleans flavors will be their biggest asset.

Seoul Sausage - Winners of Season 3. Brothers Ted and Yong Kim, with new teammate Han Ly Hwang in tow, roll out their kimchi rice balls and Korean-style sausages once more to the people of the Bay Area. Doing better than ever on the catering circuit after winning their truck, Seoul Sausage has also established brick-and-mortar restaurants in LA of their own and added new staples to their menu like Korean fried chicken and bibimbap. Nonetheless, their Korean flavors and marketing are sure to get them far.

Waffle Love - Runners-Up of Season 6. The only team to not win their season, brothers Adam, Jared, and Steven Terry look to prove they belong with the others while racing. After their race experience, the brand has expanded from their home in Provo, Utah to five states with ten brick-and-mortars. After a previous falling out saw Steve leave the brand and work in construction two years ago, the brothers are bringing with them their secret Belgian Liège waffle recipe, fast-paced prep, social media expertise, and their Mormon faith. This team will need to find the winner's edge that could've won them $50,000 in 2015 while travelling Route 66.

Episodes

Welcome Back, Winners (Week 1)

The champions of seasons past meet with Tyler and Fernando, the head baker of the oldest and longest continuously run business in San Francisco, Boudin Bakery. With them are tables with loaves of Boudin's legendary sourdough bread, which brings them to their first challenge. Once they all get their keys and get back into their trucks, they hit the stores before they take to the streets. Aloha Plate, Seoul Sausage, Mystikka Masala, Waffle Love, and Middle Feast head to Spark Social food park; whereas NOLA Creations and Lime Truck locate to Soma Streat. Some teams have begun to sold faster than others, and even have sold out of product. Mystikka decide to close early, Aloha go back shopping, and Waffle Love take advantage by trying to sell to customers. It's now Day 2, Lime Truck and NOLA Creations relocate to Spark Social, Waffle bring out their savory side to get the lunch crowd, and Seoul and Mystikka try their luck at Soma Streat.

Challenge #1: The teams will have to cut sourdough loaves into bread bowls, with one of the loaves having the keys to their food truck baked inside of them. Once a team has found their keys, they can begin to sell with seed money of $350. If a bread bowl isn't cut perfectly, Tyler and Fernando will toss another loaf of bread onto their table. Aloha Plate were first to finish, followed by NOLA Creations, Seoul Sausage, Mystikka Masala, Waffle Love, The Lime Truck, and finally The Middle Feast.

Challenge #2: Fernando comes by the trucks with a crate full of sourdough and a note from Tyler. The teams will have to create a bread bowl dish, which they can price however they want, and the team that makes the most money off of the dish will have their sales of it doubled. The winner was Aloha Plate.

Old-School Selling (Week 2)

Arriving at Raymond Vineyards in Napa Valley AVA, Tyler and vineyard owner Jean-Charles Boisset introduce the six remaining teams to their first two-part challenge. After collecting their $400 seed money, they all return to San Francisco, but no before Tyler gives them a phone call on the way. In a Speed Bump-like situation, Tyler had disabled all their social media accounts, forcing them all to promote themselves as if they were rookies, in addition to them all being at the same place for the weekend (Marina Green). With expensive store prices and a health-conscious city, the six trucks lengthen their menu and price high; though it's mostly all for naught as the drawbacks of no social media initially leave many trucks high and dry. On Day 2, the teams make due with the lack of social media before another call from Tyler rings in. He brings another challenge, one that doesn't suit the nearly sold-out Aloha Plate.

Challenge #1: The teams have 30 minutes to harvest Cabernet Sauvignon grapes within the vineyard, afterwards they would meet Tyler and Jean-Charles in the rose lawn. There, one team member will have to place the grapes into their team's crush barrel, where another will stomp on them to produce juice, and the last member will collect the juice into a carafe and pour it into a jar. The team to finish first will be able to shut down a truck of their choosing for an hour, while also making a member of the selected team into their personal assistant for that time. The winner was Seoul Sausage, who chose to shut down The Lime Truck and make Daniel their PA.

Challenge #2: A reserve bottle of Cabernet Sauvignon from Raymond Vineyards arrives in the team's trucks, and they will use the wine to construct a dish that Tyler will personally taste. The best tasting dish will win that team $500 towards their till. The winner was Seoul Sausage.

Lost in the Redwoods (Week 3)

Driving into the Redwood Forest of California, Tyler and the teams convene in the woods to begin their first challenge. As they return to San Francisco, teams look to make the most out of their seed money to keep themselves open and selling for the day. Which can be difficult if the equipment breaks, as Lime Truck's food processor and Seoul Sausage's flattop found out, who are forced to switch to manual prep. As for location, all but Aloha (located at Parklab Gardens) set up at SPARK Social. While the majority of the trucks begin taking orders, Waffle Love cut a deal with a nursing home to do a stressful 100 waffle delivery order. As the teams scramble to prep fast on Day 2, a call from Tyler sets a precedent for the entire competition so far.

Challenge #1: The teams have to forage the woods for ingredients to create a signature trail mix for a family of hikers (mom, daughter, and son) in the Santa Cruz Mountains, with only a map to find four stations (Salty, Sweet, Crunchy, and Decadent). The team with the best trail mix will have their grocery bill paid by Tyler, while the $350 seed money goes straight to their till. The winner was Seoul Sausage.

Challenge #2: Teams have to use the ingredients they found in the forest to make a dish they'll sell on their menu, and the team that sold the most will be immune from elimination. The winner was Aloha Plate.

Beach Bite Battle (Week 4)

Convening on Ocean Beach, home to some strong rip currents and large waves, Tyler welcomes Sonic's senior Director of New Product Innovation, Mackenzie Gibson, back to the show to initiate the first challenge of the weekend. Returning to the city, the teams have to find a location that fits their one menu item from said challenge. Around the end of Day 1, Aloha Plate are forced to close early due to their location closing and having no backup plan. On Day 2, as Waffle Love drive for a spot, they realize they left their groceries behind. Now with their competitors on the streets ready to sell - right next to each other, no less, them going back costs them valuable selling hours.

Challenge: Tyler has the teams create a crispy beachside snack that a group of surfers will judge, and the snack they think is the best gets the team $300 added to their till. Also, the snacks they created will be the only thing they sell, priced at $2.50. The team who sells the most snacks also earns $300 toward their till. Seoul Sausage had the best-tasting snack, while Aloha Plate sold the most snacks.

Delivery Nightmare (Week 5)

Arriving at Thrive City's Chase Center - home to the Golden State Warriors - and greeted by the sight of their logos on the front jumbotron, Tyler surprises the final three with a new twist. Their trucks will be converted into delivery services for their first day. But not before their menu is decided by a challenge fitting their location. Now having to take their social media marketing and cooking savvy to a new level in order to connect with customers and prep food fast, they can't afford to have any mistakes made. Which proved initially difficult for Waffle Love after they accidentally left their keys in the truck and their mixers break down. With the elements of wind and traffic very much against them, along with only one team member having to deal with the food, stress starts to set in. The following day, the final three are back to selling off their trucks, with the Thrive City farmer's market coming to the Chase center. Now launching their most ambitious menus to date, complete with a sampler pack, pricing wars are bound to happen. Along with fridges breaking down, in Seoul Sausage's case.

Challenge #1: The teams have one member compete in a basketball shootout, where they have to make five baskets before they get to choose the 2 proteins of their choice (chicken, beef, pork, turkey, shrimp, and fish). The Lime Truck were first and chose fish and pork, Waffle Love were second and chose chicken and beef, and Seoul Sausage were last and left with shrimp and turkey.

Challenge #2: The teams have to create a healthy Farm to Truck special for a special judge: Golden State Warriors Player Development Coach Aaron Miles. Miles will taste their specials, and the one he believes is worthy of an All-Star champion will receive $500 in their till. The winner was Waffle Love.

All-Star Finale (Week 6)

It's the final week of the season, as The Lime Truck and Seoul Sausage make their way to Tyler at Union Square, where they are given a history lesson on the fortune cookie, the catalyst of their first challenge. After a tight finish to the first day of selling with a $59 differential, Day 2 brings a new challenge from Tyler. Meeting Tyler at his restaurant, Wayfare Tavern - celebrating its 10th anniversary - he gives the teams a talk about defining who they are as a food truck. With team members respective parents coming out to support, this gives the final two one more push to the finish.

Challenge #1: The teams pick three fortune cookies that hide interesting ingredients, and they must use the ingredients in a special that they'll sell in Union Square. The Lime Truck received pig's ears, bok choy, and Dragon Eye; while Seoul Sausage found chicken feet, Buddha's hand, and wood ear mushrooms. Whoever sells the most specials wins $400 in their till. The winner was Seoul Sausage.

Challenge #2: The teams have to create a brand new, legacy-defining dish that is true to their name. Once they've made their signature dish, Tyler will judge them. The dish he feels represents the team best will earn $400 to their till. The winner was Seoul Sausage.

Results

 Team that won The Great Food Truck Race.
 Team who came in first that week.
 Team that won money towards their till that week.
 Team that won a non-monetary challenge for that week.
 Team eliminated for that week.

: Waffle Love were originally in first place, but Aloha Plate's doubled sales from the bread bowl challenge pushed them up from second to first

: Dollar amounts for Mystikka Masala were not announced

: Waffle Love had gotten into an accident where the repairs came from their till. The repair cost was not announced

: Dollar amounts for NOLA Creations and Waffle Love were not announced

: Aloha Plate also won immunity from one of the challenges, not that it mattered since they won that week.

: Dollar amounts for The Middle Feast were not announced.

: The Lime Truck was originally in first place, but Seoul Sausage's prize from the beachside snack challenge pushed them from second to first.

Season 15: 2022 (Hottest Season Ever)

Dubbed "The Hottest Season Ever", nine novice teams of food truck operators travel through the California coast, with Tyler Florence lining up several of the most difficult challenges on the show to date. From celebrity judges to strange menu additions and the opportunity to work alongside former competitors, the last team remaining, as always, will win $50,000 to start their own food truck business.

Truck Teams

Amawele’s - Translating to "the twins" in Zulu or Xhosa. After moving from Durban, South Africa to San Francisco seventeen years ago, twin sisters Pamela and Wendy Drew started to miss the South African cuisine from their childhood. After failing to find such authentic food in their new home, they decided to make it themselves, opening up Amawele’s South African Kitchen cooking service. Along with their roommate Emma Januarie to keep heads cool, the all-female trio will be serving dishes such as Durban chicken curry and peri peri chicken, all packed with artisanal South African flavors.

Eso Artisanal Pasta - Coming from Morristown, New Jersey, AJ Sankofa is a chef formally trained in Italy and professionally experienced in Michelin-star restaurants. Meeting his fiancée Kristina Gambarian in New York City, they first struggled to find work at the start of the COVID-19 pandemic before they opened up a pasta business. Joined by AJ's childhood friend Matt McFadden, their truck concept can be described as a "show on wheels", allowing their customers to see how they prepare their handmade pastas and sauces.

Food Flight - Kate Schulz and Betsy Wallace are sisters and co-hosts of the podcast "Dinner Sisters", where they take up a challenge making dinner from internet and cookbook recipes every episode. Chef Grant Stevens is a recurring guest on the show but has been working in offices after the pandemic. Wanting to "live a better life" in Kate's words, she and Grant will be preparing "small sandwiches with global flavors" - based on Atlanta's Hartsfield–Jackson Atlanta International Airport being so busy - while Betsy works to try and bring in customers.

Girl’s Got Balls - Shauna Fetterman is a mother and culinary school graduate from Fox River Grove, Illinois who was always fascinated by food. While spending time with her children during quarantine after losing her husband, she began creating and selling arancini balls with contemporary flavors and is returning to food service operating a trailer. Her friend and hype woman, Lizzy Scudder, joined her business after a while, and with Carrie Jones rounding out their trio, these women look to be the first across the finish line.

Maybe Cheese Born With It - Based in Toledo, Ohio, drag queen David Gedert, also known as Sugar Vermont, has always wanted to start a food truck of his own. First operating a revamped 1960s RV, he knew that it needs to be replaced with a professional-grade truck. With fellow drag performer Mahogany Reign as head chef, this team serves creative twists on comfort food, using their flamboyant personality to lure customers to their window. Joining the two is Keith Logue, David's friend who is acts as a jack-of-all-trades between taking and cooking orders.

Salsa Queen - The titular leader of the trio, SalsaQueen, is a mother of seven who, for eight years, operated a salsa business out of Salt Lake City to provide for her family. With a big personality, bigger aspirations, and a "whatever it takes" mentality for success, she looks to use those assets and her Mexican-fusion concepts to not just win but prove to her children that anything is possible. Accompanying her is friend Missy Workman, a private chef and caterer, and her husband Jim Birch; both of whom will be running the kitchen.

Sauté Kingz - Run by the Foreman family - father Count Thomas James, mother Jessica, and son Jesshuan - this truck from Daytona Beach, Florida provides a menu of elevated, international soul food dishes. Count holds a strong authority in the kitchen, running a business that not only provides quality food with unique flavors, but also provides culinary experience to the underserved in his community. With such eye-catching dishes, coupled with Jessica's energy and Jesshuan's kitchen skills, Count looks to bring home to his family and his community a big help.

SEÑOREATA - First generation Cuban-Brazilian-American Evanice Holz is a fearless leader who started her Los Angeles food business five years ago, selling tradition Cuban cuisine from a Toyota Prius. While the menu, mostly learned through her father, perfectly reflects Evanice's Cuban roots, it has one unique twist: it's all plant based. Looking for an upgrade in operations, she is joined by Chelly Saludado, who has worked with Evanice since the beginning by helping her adapt to the ever-changing LA food scene, as well as their friend Adri Law, who'll be working the front of the house.

Southern Pride Asian Fusion - Operated by three culinary school graduates and military veterans, DJ Williams, Houston Greenlee and Gio Palacio were deployed in Iraq and Afghanistan before meeting in the same school. All three have dreams of running their own establishments in Colorado Springs, Colorado, DJ dreaming of a food truck, while Houston and Gio - a married couple - wish for a restaurant. With DJ's Mexican influence, Houston's Southern cooking backgrounds, and Gio's Filipino heritage, they hope that winning the race will further their chances of achieving their goals.

Episodes

Laguna Beach Heat (Week 1)

First meeting Tyler Florence on the coast of Laguna Beach, the nine trios begin their first challenge for an advantage. Once finished, the teams go shopping, where Amawele's couldn't find special ingredients, Food Flight bought out the bakery's entire stock of hoagie rolls, Girl's Got Balls go over their budget and Southern Pride got lost on the way. At their joint spot a half-mile from the beach, many of the trucks couldn't compete with Sugar's salesmanship, despite the negative reception their dishes received from customers. To compete, many trucks altered their sales methods. Amawele's lost time as they detoured to a specialty store while their competitors started opening and had trouble getting sales immediately. Tyler would later give them advice on having a simpler menu for better time management. On Day 2, the teams found their own locations, but somehow many of them had parked at the same grocery store. In a bid to gain clientele, Salsa Queen began promoting their food to passersby in an identical fashion to SEÑOREATA, causing tension between the two trucks. In addition, several trucks felt conflicted about other team's higher or lower prices, as well as their own price points. At elimination, Tyler talked about the alliances and rivalries that formed and addresses Maybe Cheese Born With It's negative consumer reviews.

Challenge 1: The teams had to create a flavorful and spicy dish utilizing the varieties of chili peppers ranging from mild to hot in spice. (poblano, jalapeño, serrano, Thai chili, habanero, or ghost pepper.) The winning team got $400 added to their till. The winner was Amawele's.

Challenge 2: The teams had to sell a special inspired by one of their competitor's first challenge dish. Amawele's were able to sell their own original dish because they won the first challenge. The team that makes the most money off their special earns $400 in their till. The winner was Maybe Cheese Born With It, beating Southern Pride by exactly $18, since they priced their dish one dollar more expensive.

Hot Season, Cold Location (Week 2)

Convening above Dodger Stadium, Tyler reminds the teams of the large and competitive food truck scene in Los Angeles County. One of the best food trucks in America, he believes, happens to be based in Los Angeles: two-time Great Food Truck Race Champions The Lime Truck (Daniel, Jesse, and Mark). After the veteran trio gave the rookies advice about running a truck, they are immediately given one of the toughest challenges on the show. While the teams just begin their prep, Lime Truck is already open and selling, gaining a large line. To compete, Salsa Queen attempts to promote their food to those waiting in line, but few are willing to even spare a passing glance. Many teams are taking orders (and customer's money) while their kitchen is still prepping, which could jeopardize their sales. Lime Truck continues to dominate the lunch rush, so many of them try to team up and gain customers. Amawele's and Maybe Cheese's loud personalities start gaining attention, while Eso's Artisinal Pasta and Sauté Kingz fresh products are costing them sales. Amawele's begin noticing unfinished food from the other trucks in the garbage while their containers were cleaned out. By the end, Lime Truck dominated service, but not before giving the prospects some more encouraging words. The following day, Tyler gives them a call, sending them to the San Fernando Valley to being their second challenge. Now let loose on Los Angeles, many think about parking by well-know tourist spots. Unfortunately, many of them can't find sizable foot traffic or even a good spot. SEÑOREATA know better, as they go east towards Silver Lake, parking by a farmer's market near Evanice's home. Amawele's struggle with communication, which nearly costs them a parking spot. Maybe Cheese tries to find salvation from SEÑOREATA, but don't get an answer, so Tyler refers them to a parking spot a couple blocks away. And as for Eso, a sideswipe to a COVID-19 testing site could be costly.

Challenge #1: The trucks have to sell alongside The Lime Truck for Day 1. The team that is closest to The Lime Truck's sales wins $500 in their till. If they manage to outsell The Lime Truck, they will be immune from elimination. The winner was SEÑOREATA, who was closest to The Lime Truck's sales, and thus, earned an additional $500.

Challenge #2: Teams have to create a dish inspired by one of three smoothies from Tropical Smoothie Cafe: Sunrise Sunset, Island Green, or Bahama Mama. The team that sells the most dishes earns $300 in their till. The winner was Southern Pride Asian Fusion.

No Time to Swap (Week 3)

Arriving on the boardwalk of Venice Beach - home to modern skateboard culture, Muscle Beach, and various street attractions - Tyler introduces the seven trios to celebrity chef and Food Network personality Antonia Lofaso, who gives them some words about how to show who you are through food, segueing into their first challenge. Once the teams are out on the streets, they hope to take advantage of the higher foot traffic while navigating the small roads. Unfortunately, Food Flight don't seem to have much luck. And as they find a spot, Tyler calls in to give the teams a history lesson on Venice Beach and cannabis. On day 2, Tyler decides to send the teams to Abbot Kinney Boulevard, while also throwing them a "Speed Bump"-esque curveball. That twist ends up sending SalsaQueen over the limit, running out of the car and onto the streets, with no one able to track her down. Because of that, the team has decided to withdraw.

Challenge #1: Tyler and Antonia have the teams create a signature dish in 30 minutes that represents who they truly are. Once the two have judged their dishes, the one they think is the best will win the team $200 in their till. The winning team would also be able to stay together on Day 2, while the other teams swap one member between them. The winner was Eso Artisanal Pasta. Meanwhile, Gio from Southern Pride Asian Fusion swapped with Emma from Amawele's, Maybe Cheese Born With It swapped Kevin with Grant of Food Flight, and Salsa Queen would swap with SEÑOREATA's. However, after SalsaQueen ran off, SEÑOREATA, as a result, gave Chely a break to stay open for the afternoon. 

Challenge #2: Tyler challenges the teams to incorporate hemp into an existing menu dish. The team that sells the most hemp specials will earn $400 in their till. The winner was SEÑOREATA, who tied with Amawele's at 43 specials but priced their dish $12 higher.

Teams Fall Apart From Within (Week 4)

In the ocean adventure community of Redondo Beach, the six remaining teams are reminded by Tyler that those who favorite the beach don't have the time to enjoy a sit-down meal. With that, he introduces them to Season 3 champions and All Stars runner-up Seoul Sausage (Yong, Han, and Ted) to talk about a traditional Korean box lunch called a doshirak. Once they're on the streets, Grant starts getting frustrated due to how much time they put into their work with so little reward. Meanwhile, some teams began to take Tyler's previous advice to heart in order to get better sales and reviews, with Eso now buying their artisanal pastas, and Maybe Cheese Born With It uses Tyler's bechamel recipe. Food Flight's stress is added when water begins to leak from their truck but turns out it's not anything too bad. Eso and SEÑOREATA didn't feel like they have competition between each other, but the latter is upset that the former is promoting their fried chicken in front of potential customers waiting for plant-based food. More trouble brews for Food Flight when the restaurant their parked in front of isn't happy that they're there. This causes tension between Katie, Betsy, and Grant, especially when the latter feels that his kitchen skills are being questioned, prompting Tyler to step in for an impromptu therapy session. 

Challenge #1: The teams have to create a doshirak box lunch, and the team that Seoul Sausage thinks looks the best will receive $200 in their till. Also, once their boxes were checked out, they hd to sell a dozen of them on the boardwalk at $10. The team to sell all of them first also earns $200. Amawele's had the best-looking box, while Southern Pride Asian Fusion sold all of their's the fastest.

Challenge #2: The teams have to utilize almond milk, courtesy of Almond Breeze, to create a creamy dish. Customers who try their dishes will rate them, and the team that has the highest reviews will earn $300 in their till. The winner was Southern Pride Asian Fusion.

Who Are the Secret Eaters? (Week 5)

The five trucks make their way to Manhattan Beach, a secret hub of international food, which Tyler notes is the concept of their first challenge for the weekend. As the teams begin their prep, Amawele's struggles with communication as they park their truck, only to realize their first location is not as good as they thought. Meanwhile, Southern Pride and SEÑOREATA are forced to leave before opening as they're on private property, with no real backup plan. After hitting a pothole, Maybe Cheese Born With It tears their gas pipeline, forcing them to utilize their flattop until they can relight them. And as the day winds down, DJ's family visits Southern Pride to support his culinary dream. The next day, a call from Tyler gives the teams a challenge that may seem a bit out of their element. 

Challenge #1: The teams have to create an appetizer, entree, and dessert based on three of six different cuisines: Chinese, Thai, Jamaican, French, Indian, and Iranian cuisine. They will sell those items as a part of their regular menu for the day, to which a secret group of customers made up of food bloggers and internet influencers will come by and try their dishes. Each dish will be judged separately. The best appetizer is worth $300, the best entree is worth $400, and the best dessert is worth $200, making for a possible total of $900 towards their till. Amawele's had the best entree, earning $400, and Eso Artisanal Pasta won best appetizer and dessert, earning $500.

Challenge #2: The team shave to create a nutritious post-workout recovery pairing of a snack and drink for volleyball players on the beach, with the best team voted by the players winning $300 in their till. The winner was Amawele's

Dunes Day (Week 6)

After a surprising elimination order the previous week, the final four scale atop the Glamis Dunes, the largest natural dune park in the USA, with Tyler meeting them via dune buggy. With extreme adventurers being their clientele in the desert, Tyler decides to have the teams put their resourcefulness to the test after their first challenge. Making their way to Boardmanville, Tyler also encourages teams to advertise at the local trailer park campgrounds, while also getting free buggy rides. Maybe Cheese Born With It begins to take orders long before their prep is even done, intimidating Amawele's to make the same mistake. As the desert heat starts to get to the teams, SEÑOREATA's long ticket times forces customers to go to the other trucks while they wait, with Tyler advising they trim the menu. Wendy and Keith also feel the heat, both from the pressure and temperature, almost going though burnout. The next day, Maybe Cheese again takes orders before prep's done, with Keith fully stepping off the truck.

Challenge #1: Limited to one protein for the day, Tyler has one member of each team race on sandboards down the dunes to determine their choice of protein. Choices include chicken, pork, beef, plant-based beef, and oyster mushrooms. Keith of Maybe Cheese Born With It was first and chose chicken. Adri of SEÑOREATA came in second and chose plant-based beef. Wendy of Amawele's came in third and chose beef. And AJ of Eso Artisanal Pasta came in last and chose pork.

Challenge #2: Tyler has the teams make in innovative dish between two buns for their menu, which he will judge personally. The dish he thinks is the best will win $200 for the team. In addition, the team that sells the most specials wins another $200. Amawele's won the tasting portion, while SEÑOREATA won the selling portion.

Close to the Finish Line (Week 7)

Arriving at the racetrack of the Grand Prix of Long Beach, the final three meet up with Tyler and special guest judge for their first challenge; Sonic Drive-In's Executive Branch Chief, Scott Uehlin, who provides slushies and chili-cheese coney island hot dogs for inspiration. With Eso Artisanal Pasta earning a one-hour head start to prep and sell, they've already got a major advantage. But a crowd forming at SEÑOREATA's parking spot may have put them in a good position. However, with large lines comes the eventual runout of food, forcing them to refund people. Meanwhile, Eso and Maybe Cheese Born With It are parked at the same park, but an LGBTQ parade by the local LGBTQ center gives the latter a major boost in sales. The following day, as the trucks begin strategizing, Tyler calls in for another challenge. Eso and Maybe Cheese are parked at the beach during the lunch rush, but a slow flux of foot traffic forces them to relocate, a risky decision at any point in the race.

Challenge #1: The teams have 30 minutes to produce as many coney island dog-inspired dishes as they can to feed the pit crews at the Grand Prix. Tyler and Scott will take taste their dishes and decide on the two that taste the best. Between those two teams, they will count how many paltes they completed, and the one with the most units will have an hour head start in selling. Maybe Cheese Born With It and Eso Artisanal Pasta made it past the taste challenge, but Eso Artisanal Pasta had the most units.

Challenge #2: The final three have to create a dish inspired by chicken and waffles to sell on their menu, and the team that sold the most will have their sales of that special tripled. The winner was SEÑOREATA

San Diego Showdown (Week 8)

The final two meet Tyler by the waters of San Diego as they talk about what their competitor's best-selling dish, setting up their first challenge. Set up at Ballast Point Brewing Co., Maybe Cheese Born With It and SEÑOREATA struggle to keep up with several rushes of orders when they're behind on their prep, leading to rising tensions and customers asking for refunds. With the large crowd of clienteles buying so much of their product, the latter is forced to go shopping again when they nearly sold out, with Sugar trying to sway customers into purchasing from them. Once SEÑOREATA returns, Sugar notices the smaller prices on their menu compared to his. On Day 2, the finalists inadvertently locate to Little Italy together. Down the stretch, as Sugar and Keith run down the street to grab customers, a friend of Evanice notifies SEÑOREATA of Maybe Cheese's high-priced sampler plate, giving them the fire to put out their own.

Challenge #1: Tyler has the finalists sell a special based on their competitor's best-selling menu item. Maybe Cheese Born With It had to riff off Plant Based Ceviche w/ Chips, while SEÑOREATA had to make a dish based on Sweet Dreams Are Made of Cheese. This challenge is worth $400: $200 for who makes the most off their special, and another $200 for the dish Tyler believes is the best. Maybe Cheese Born With It won the taste challenge, while SEÑOREATA won the selling challenge.

Challenge #2: Servers from Ballast Point Brewing will present a sample flight of speedboat beers to the teams and have to make a special that pairs well with one of them. The team that sells the most beer pairing specials wins $300 in their till. The winner was SEÑOREATA.

Challenge #3: In a rehash of their very first challenge, Tyler and Tijuana chef Ruffo Ibarra arrive at the finalists' trucks with jars of habanero, Trinidad Moruga scorpion, and Carolina Reaper chiles, using one of them to make a new menu special. Tyler and Ruffo will try both, and the one they think is the best balance wins an extra $300. The winner was Maybe Cheese Born With It.

Results

 Team that won The Great Food Truck Race.
 Team who came in first that week.
 Team that won money towards their till that week.
 Team that won a non-monetary challenge for that week.
 Team eliminated for that week.

: Dollar amounts for these teams were not announced.

: Dollar amounts for Eso Artisanal Pasta were not announced.

: Salsa Queen decided to forfeit the competition. If they had stayed, Food Flight would have been eliminated.

: Dollar amounts for Eso Artisanal Pasta were not announced.

: Southern Pride Asian Fusion was $150 behind Maybe Cheese Born With It.

: Dollar amounts for Amawele's were not announced.

References

Lists of reality television series episodes
Food trucks